The Ericales are a large, diverse and cosmopolitan order of dicotyledonous flowering plants,  The order includes trees, bushes, lianas, and herbaceous plants. Together with ordinary autophytic plants, the Ericales include chlorophyll-deficient mycoheterotrophic plants (e.g., Sarcodes sanguinea) and carnivorous plants (e.g., genus Sarracenia). Many species have five petals, often grown together. Fusion of the petals as a trait was traditionally used to place the order in the subclass Sympetalae. Mycorrhizal associations are quite common among the order representatives, and three kinds of mycorrhiza are found exclusively among Ericales (namely, ericoid, arbutoid and monotropoid mycorrhiza). In addition, some families among the order are notable for their exceptional ability to accumulate aluminum. The entire order contains over 8,000 species, of which the Ericaceae account for 2,000-4,000 species (by various estimates).

The anthophytes are a grouping of plant taxa bearing flower-like reproductive structures. They were formerly thought to be a clade comprising plants bearing flower-like structures.  The group contained the angiosperms - the extant flowering plants, such as roses and grasses - as well as the Gnetales and the extinct Bennettitales.

23,420 species of vascular plant have been recorded in South Africa, making it the sixth most species-rich country in the world and the most species-rich country on the African continent. Of these, 153 species are considered to be threatened. Nine biomes have been described in South Africa: Fynbos, Succulent Karoo, desert, Nama Karoo, grassland, savanna, Albany thickets, the Indian Ocean coastal belt, and forests.

The 2018 South African National Biodiversity Institute's National Biodiversity Assessment plant checklist lists 35,130 taxa in the phyla Anthocerotophyta (hornworts (6)), Anthophyta (flowering plants (33534)), Bryophyta (mosses (685)), Cycadophyta (cycads (42)), Lycopodiophyta (Lycophytes(45)), Marchantiophyta (liverworts (376)), Pinophyta (conifers (33)), and Pteridophyta (cryptogams (408)).

11 families are represented in the literature. Listed taxa include species, subspecies, varieties, and forms as recorded, some of which have subsequently been allocated to other taxa as synonyms, in which cases the accepted taxon is appended to the listing. Multiple entries under alternative names reflect taxonomic revision over time.

Actinidiaceae
Family: Actinidiaceae,

Actinidia
Genus Actinidia:
 Actinidia deliciosa (A.Chev.) C.F.Liang & A.R.Ferguson, not indigenous, naturalised, invasive

Balsaminaceae
Family: Balsaminaceae,

Impatiens
Genus IMPATIENS:
 Impatiens flanaganiae Hemsl. endemic
 Impatiens hochstetteri Warb. indigenous
 Impatiens hochstetteri Warb. subsp. hochstetteri,  indigenous
 Impatiens sodenii Engl. & Warb. not indigenous, cultivated, naturalised
 Impatiens sylvicola Burtt Davy & Greenway, indigenous
 Impatiens walleriana Hook.f. not indigenous, naturalised

Ebenaceae
Family: Ebenaceae,

Diospyros
Genus Diospyros:
 Diospyros acocksii (De Winter) De Winter, indigenous
 Diospyros austro-africana De Winter, indigenous
 Diospyros austro-africana De Winter var. austro-africana, endemic
 Diospyros austro-africana De Winter var. microphylla (Burch.) De Winter, indigenous
 Diospyros austro-africana De Winter var. rubriflora (De Winter) De Winter, indigenous
 Diospyros austro-africana De Winter var. rugosa (E.Mey. ex A.DC.) De Winter, endemic
 Diospyros dichrophylla (Gand.) De Winter, indigenous
 Diospyros galpinii (Hiern) De Winter, indigenous
 Diospyros glabra (L.) De Winter, endemic
 Diospyros glandulifera De Winter, endemic
 Diospyros inhacaensis F.White, indigenous
 Diospyros loureiriana G.Don, indigenous
 Diospyros loureiriana G.Don subsp. loureiriana,  indigenous
 Diospyros lycioides Desf. indigenous
 Diospyros lycioides Desf. subsp. guerkei (Kuntze) De Winter, indigenous
 Diospyros lycioides Desf. subsp. lycioides,  indigenous
 Diospyros lycioides Desf. subsp. nitens (Harv. ex Hiern) De Winter, endemic
 Diospyros lycioides Desf. subsp. sericea (Bernh.) De Winter, indigenous
 Diospyros mespiliformis Hochst. ex A.DC. indigenous
 Diospyros natalensis (Harv.) Brenan, indigenous
 Diospyros natalensis (Harv.) Brenan subsp. natalensis,  indigenous
 Diospyros natalensis (Harv.) Brenan subsp. nummularia (Brenan) Jordaan, indigenous
 Diospyros nummularia Brenan, accepted as Diospyros natalensis (Harv.) Brenan subsp. nummularia (Brenan) Jordaan, indigenous
 Diospyros pallens (Thunb.) F.White, endemic
 Diospyros ramulosa (E.Mey. ex A.DC.) De Winter, indigenous
 Diospyros rotundifolia Hiern, indigenous
 Diospyros scabrida (Harv. ex Hiern) De Winter, indigenous
 Diospyros scabrida (Harv. ex Hiern) De Winter var. cordata (E.Mey. ex A.DC.) De Winter, endemic
 Diospyros scabrida (Harv. ex Hiern) De Winter var. scabrida,  endemic
 Diospyros simii (Kuntze) De Winter, endemic
 Diospyros usambarensis F.White, accepted as Diospyros loureiriana G.Don, indigenous
 Diospyros villosa (L.) De Winter, indigenous
 Diospyros villosa (L.) De Winter var. parvifolia (De Winter) De Winter, endemic
 Diospyros villosa (L.) De Winter var. villosa,  endemic
 Diospyros whyteana (Hiern) F.White, indigenous

Euclea
Genus Euclea:
 Euclea acutifolia E.Mey. ex A.DC. endemic
 Euclea coriacea A.DC. indigenous
 Euclea crispa (Thunb.) Gurke, indigenous
 Euclea crispa (Thunb.) Gurke subsp. crispa,  indigenous
 Euclea crispa (Thunb.) Gurke subsp. ovata (Burch.) F.White, indigenous
 Euclea daphnoides Hiern, indigenous
 Euclea dewinteri Retief, endemic
 Euclea divinorum Hiern, indigenous
 Euclea lancea Thunb. endemic
 Euclea linearis Zeyh. ex Hiern, indigenous
 Euclea myrtina Burch. accepted as Euclea undulata Thunb. 
 Euclea natalensis A.DC. indigenous
 Euclea natalensis A.DC. subsp. angustifolia F.White, indigenous
 Euclea natalensis A.DC. subsp. capensis F.White, endemic
 Euclea natalensis A.DC. subsp. magutensis F.White, endemic
 Euclea natalensis A.DC. subsp. natalensis,  indigenous
 Euclea natalensis A.DC. subsp. obovata F.White, indigenous
 Euclea natalensis A.DC. subsp. rotundifolia F.White, indigenous
 Euclea polyandra (L.f.) E.Mey. ex Hiern, endemic
 Euclea pseudebenus E.Mey. ex A.DC. indigenous
 Euclea racemosa Murray, indigenous
 Euclea racemosa Murray subsp. bernardii F.White, endemic
 Euclea racemosa Murray subsp. macrophylla (E.Mey. ex A.DC.) F.White, endemic
 Euclea racemosa Murray subsp. racemosa,  endemic
 Euclea racemosa Murray subsp. sinuata F.White, indigenous
 Euclea racemosa Murray subsp. zuluensis F.White, indigenous
 Euclea schimperi (A.DC.) Dandy, indigenous
 Euclea schimperi (A.DC.) Dandy var. daphnoides (Hiern) De Winter, accepted as Euclea daphnoides Hiern, indigenous
 Euclea sekhukhuniensis Retief, Siebert & A.E.van Wyk, indigenous
 Euclea tomentosa E.Mey. ex A.DC. endemic
 Euclea undulata Thunb. indigenous
 Euclea undulata Thunb. var. myrtina (Burch.) Hiern, accepted as Euclea undulata Thunb. indigenous

Ericaceae
Family: Ericaceae,

Acrostemon
Genus Acrostemon:
 Acrostemon barkerae Compton, accepted as Erica eriocephala Lam. present
 Acrostemon equisetoides Klotzsch, accepted as Erica eriocephala Lam. present
 Acrostemon eriocephalus (Klotzsch) N.E.Br. accepted as Erica pilosiflora E.G.H.Oliv. subsp. pilosiflora,  present
 Acrostemon glandulosus Rach, accepted as Erica eriocephala Lam. present
 Acrostemon incurvus (Klotzsch) Benth. accepted as Erica eriocephala Lam. present
 Acrostemon schlechteri N.E.Br. accepted as Erica radicans (L.Guthrie) E.G.H.Oliv. subsp. schlechteri (N.E.Br.) E.G.H.Oliv. present
 Acrostemon stokoei L.Guthrie, accepted as Erica eriocephala Lam. present
 Acrostemon xeranthemifolius (Salisb.) E.G.H.Oliv. accepted as Erica xeranthemifolia Salisb. present

Anomalanthus
Genus Anomalanthus:
 Anomalanthus anguliger N.E.Br. accepted as Erica anguliger (N.E.Br.) E.G.H.Oliv. present
 Anomalanthus collinus N.E.Br. accepted as Erica anguliger (N.E.Br.) E.G.H.Oliv. present
 Anomalanthus curviflorus N.E.Br. accepted as Erica anguliger (N.E.Br.) E.G.H.Oliv. present
 Anomalanthus discolor Klotzsch, accepted as Erica anguliger (N.E.Br.) E.G.H.Oliv. present
 Anomalanthus galpinii N.E.Br. accepted as Erica anguliger (N.E.Br.) E.G.H.Oliv. present
 Anomalanthus marlothii N.E.Br. accepted as Erica anguliger (N.E.Br.) E.G.H.Oliv. present
 Anomalanthus parviflorus (Klotzsch) N.E.Br. accepted as Erica anguliger (N.E.Br.) E.G.H.Oliv. present
 Anomalanthus puberulus (Klotzsch) N.E.Br. accepted as Erica anguliger (N.E.Br.) E.G.H.Oliv. present
 Anomalanthus scoparius Klotzsch, accepted as Erica anguliger (N.E.Br.) E.G.H.Oliv. present
 Anomalanthus turbinatus N.E.Br. accepted as Erica anguliger (N.E.Br.) E.G.H.Oliv. present

Arachnocalyx
Genus Arachnocalyx:
 Arachnocalyx cereris Compton, accepted as Erica cereris (Compton) E.G.H.Oliv. present
 Arachnocalyx viscidus (N.E.Br.) E.G.H.Oliv. accepted as Erica arachnocalyx E.G.H.Oliv. present

Blaeria
Genus Blaeria:
 Blaeria barbigera (Salisb.) G.Don, accepted as Erica barbigera Salisb. endemic
 Blaeria campanulata Benth. accepted as Erica equisetifolia Salisb. present
 Blaeria coccinea Klotzsch, accepted as Erica longimontana E.G.H.Oliv. present
 Blaeria dumosa J.C.Wendl. accepted as Erica equisetifolia Salisb. present
 Blaeria dumosa J.C.Wendl. var. breviflora N.E.Br. accepted as Erica equisetifolia Salisb. present
 Blaeria equisetifolia (Salisb.) G.Don, accepted as Erica equisetifolia Salisb. present
 Blaeria ericoides L. accepted as Erica ericoides (L.) E.G.H.Oliv. present
 Blaeria fastigiata Benth. accepted as Erica longimontana E.G.H.Oliv. present
 Blaeria flava Bolus, accepted as Erica equisetifolia Salisb. present
 Blaeria flexuosa Benth. accepted as Erica multiflexuosa E.G.H.Oliv. present
 Blaeria fuscescens Klotzsch, accepted as Erica fuscescens (Klotzsch) E.G.H.Oliv. present
 Blaeria klotzschii Alm & T.C.E.Fr. accepted as Erica klotzschii (Alm & T.C.E.Fr.) E.G.H.Oliv. present
 Blaeria kraussiana Klotzsch ex Walp. accepted as Erica russakiana E.G.H.Oliv. present
 Blaeria muirii L.Guthrie, accepted as Erica rosacea (L.Guthrie) E.G.H.Oliv. subsp. rosacea,  present
 Blaeria oppositifolia L.Guthrie, accepted as Erica equisetifolia Salisb. present
 Blaeria sagittata (Klotzsch ex Benth.) Alm & T.C.E.Fr. accepted as Erica sagittata Klotzsch ex Benth. present

Coccosperma
Genus Coccosperma:
 Coccosperma areolatum N.E.Br. accepted as Erica areolata (N.E.Br.) E.G.H.Oliv. present
 Coccosperma hexandrum (Klotzsch) Druce, accepted as Erica subcapitata (N.E.Br.) E.G.H.Oliv. present
 Coccosperma rugosum Klotzsch, accepted as Erica rugata E.G.H.Oliv. present

Coilostigma
Genus Coilostigma:
 Coilostigma glabrum Benth. accepted as Erica burchelliana E.G.H.Oliv. present
 Coilostigma zeyherianum Klotzsch, accepted as Erica zeyheriana (Klotzsch) E.G.H.Oliv. present
 Coilostigma zeyherianum Klotzsch var. tenuifolium (Klotzsch) E.G.H.Oliv. accepted as Erica zeyheriana (Klotzsch) E.G.H.Oliv. present

Eremia
Genus Eremia:
 Eremia brevifolia Benth. accepted as Erica velatiflora E.G.H.Oliv. present
 Eremia calycina Compton, accepted as Erica bokkeveldia E.G.H.Oliv. present
 Eremia curvistyla (N.E.Br.) E.G.H.Oliv. accepted as Erica curvistyla (N.E.Br.) E.G.H.Oliv. present
 Eremia florifera Compton, accepted as Erica florifera (Compton) E.G.H.Oliv. present
 Eremia peltata Compton, accepted as Erica cetrata E.G.H.Oliv. present
 Eremia recurvata Klotzsch, accepted as Erica recurvifolia E.G.H.Oliv. present
 Eremia totta (Thunb.) D.Don, accepted as Erica totta Thunb. present

Eremiella
Genus Eremiella:
 Eremiella outeniquae Compton, accepted as Erica outeniquae (Compton) E.G.H.Oliv. present

Erica
Genus Erica:
 Erica abbottii E.G.H.Oliv. endemic
 Erica abelii E.G.H.Oliv. endemic
 Erica abietina L. indigenous
 Erica abietina L. subsp. abietina,  endemic
 Erica abietina L. subsp. atrorosea E.G.H.Oliv. & I.M.Oliv. endemic
 Erica abietina L. subsp. aurantiaca E.G.H.Oliv. & I.M.Oliv. endemic
 Erica abietina L. subsp. constantiana E.G.H.Oliv. & I.M.Oliv. endemic
 Erica abietina L. subsp. diabolis E.G.H.Oliv. & I.M.Oliv. endemic
 Erica abietina L. subsp. perfoliosa E.G.H.Oliv. & I.M.Oliv. endemic
 Erica abietina L. subsp. petraea E.G.H.Oliv. & I.M.Oliv. endemic
 Erica abietina L. var. echiiflora (Bolus) Salter, accepted as Erica abietina L. subsp. diabolis E.G.H.Oliv. & I.M.Oliv. present
 Erica accommodata Klotzsch ex Benth. indigenous
 Erica accommodata Klotzsch ex Benth. var. accommodata,  endemic
 Erica accommodata Klotzsch ex Benth. var. subviscidula Bolus, endemic
 Erica acockii Compton, accepted as Erica alexandri Guthrie & Bolus subsp. acockii (Compton) E.G.H.Oliv. present
 Erica acuta Andrews, indigenous
 Erica acuta Andrews var. acuta,  endemic
 Erica acuta Andrews var. breviflora Dulfer, endemic
 Erica adaequata Tausch, indigenous
 Erica adnata L.Bolus, endemic
 Erica adunca Benth. accepted as Erica triceps Link, present
 Erica aemula Guthrie & Bolus, endemic
 Erica aestiva Markotter, indigenous
 Erica aestiva Markotter var. aestiva,  indigenous
 Erica aestiva Markotter var. minor Dulfer, endemic
 Erica affinis Benth. endemic
 Erica agglutinans E.G.H.Oliv. endemic
 Erica aghillana Guthrie & Bolus, indigenous
 Erica aghillana Guthrie & Bolus var. aghillana,  endemic
 Erica aghillana Guthrie & Bolus var. latifolia Guthrie & Bolus, endemic
 Erica albens L. indigenous
 Erica albens L. var. albens,  endemic
 Erica albens L. var. longiflora Benth. endemic
 Erica albertyniae E.G.H.Oliv. endemic
 Erica albescens Klotzsch ex Benth. indigenous
 Erica albescens Klotzsch ex Benth. var. albescens,  endemic
 Erica albescens Klotzsch ex Benth. var. erecta Bolus, endemic
 Erica albospicata Hilliard & B.L.Burtt, indigenous
 Erica alexandri Guthrie & Bolus, indigenous
 Erica alexandri Guthrie & Bolus subsp. acockii (Compton) E.G.H.Oliv. endemic
 Erica alexandri Guthrie & Bolus subsp. alexandri,  endemic
 Erica alfredii Guthrie & Bolus, endemic
 Erica algida Bolus, indigenous
 Erica alnea E.G.H.Oliv. endemic
 Erica alopecurus Harv. indigenous
 Erica alopecurus Harv. var. alopecurus,  indigenous
 Erica alopecurus Harv. var. glabriflora Bolus, endemic
 Erica altevivens H.A.Baker, endemic
 Erica alticola Guthrie & Bolus, endemic
 Erica altiphila E.G.H.Oliv. endemic
 Erica amalophylla E.G.H.Oliv. & I.M.Oliv. endemic
 Erica amatolensis E.G.H.Oliv. endemic
 Erica amicorum E.G.H.Oliv. endemic
 Erica amoena J.C.Wendl. endemic
 Erica amphigena Guthrie & Bolus, endemic
 Erica ampullacea Curtis, indigenous
 Erica ampullacea Curtis var. ampullacea,  endemic
 Erica ampullacea Curtis var. obbata (Andrews) Bolus, endemic
 Erica andreaei Compton, indigenous
 Erica aneimena Dulfer, endemic
 Erica anemodes E.G.H.Oliv. indigenous
 Erica anguliger (N.E.Br.) E.G.H.Oliv. endemic
 Erica angulosa E.G.H.Oliv. endemic
 Erica annalis E.G.H.Oliv. & I.M.Oliv. endemic
 Erica annectens Guthrie & Bolus, endemic
 Erica anomala Hilliard & B.L.Burtt, endemic
 Erica arachnocalyx E.G.H.Oliv. endemic
 Erica arcuata Compton, endemic
 Erica ardens Andrews, endemic
 Erica arenaria L.Bolus, endemic
 Erica areolata (N.E.Br.) E.G.H.Oliv. indigenous
 Erica argentea Klotzsch ex Benth. indigenous
 Erica argentea Klotzsch ex Benth. var. argentea,  endemic
 Erica argentea Klotzsch ex Benth. var. rigida Bolus, endemic
 Erica argyrea Guthrie & Bolus, endemic
 Erica aristata Andrews, indigenous
 Erica aristata Andrews var. aristata,  endemic
 Erica aristata Andrews var. minor (L.Bolus) Dulfer, endemic
 Erica aristata Andrews var. turrisbabylonica H.A.Baker, endemic
 Erica aristifolia Benth. endemic
 Erica armata Klotzsch ex Benth. indigenous
 Erica armata Klotzsch ex Benth. var. armata,  endemic
 Erica armata Klotzsch ex Benth. var. breviaristata Bolus, endemic
 Erica artemisioides (Klotzsch) E.G.H.Oliv. endemic
 Erica articularis L. indigenous
 Erica articularis L. var. articularis,  endemic
 Erica articularis L. var. implexa Bolus, endemic
 Erica articularis L. var. meyeriana Bolus, endemic
 Erica aspalathifolia Bolus, indigenous
 Erica aspalathifolia Bolus var. aspalathifolia,  endemic
 Erica aspalathifolia Bolus var. bachmannii Bolus, endemic
 Erica aspalathoides Guthrie & Bolus, endemic
 Erica astroites Guthrie & Bolus, indigenous
 Erica astroites Guthrie & Bolus var. astroites,  endemic
 Erica astroites Guthrie & Bolus var. minor Guthrie & Bolus, endemic
 Erica atherstonei Diels ex Guthrie & Bolus, endemic
 Erica atricha Dulfer, endemic
 Erica atromontana E.G.H.Oliv. endemic
 Erica atropurpurea Dulfer, endemic
 Erica atrovinosa E.G.H.Oliv. endemic
 Erica auriculata Guthrie & Bolus, accepted as Erica greyi Guthrie & Bolus, present
 Erica autroverna Hilliard, accepted as Erica revoluta (Bolus) L.E.Davidson, present
 Erica autumnalis L.Bolus, endemic
 Erica axillaris Thunb. indigenous
 Erica axilliflora Bartl. endemic
 Erica azaleifolia Salisb. endemic
 Erica baccans L. endemic
 Erica bakeri T.M.Salter, endemic
 Erica banksia Andrews, accepted as Erica banksii Andrews subsp. banksii,  endemic
 Erica banksia Andrews var. purpurea (Andrews) Dulfer, accepted as Erica banksii (Andrews) E.G.H.Oliv. subsp. purpurea Andrews, indigenous
 Erica banksii Andrews, indigenous
 Erica banksii Andrews subsp. banksii,  endemic
 Erica banksii Andrews subsp. comptonii (T.M.Salter) E.G.H.Oliv. & I.M.Oliv. endemic
 Erica banksii (Andrews) E.G.H.Oliv. subsp. purpurea Andrews, endemic
 Erica barbigera Salisb. endemic
 Erica barbigeroides E.G.H.Oliv. endemic
 Erica barrydalensis L.Bolus, endemic
 Erica baueri Andrews, indigenous
 Erica baueri Andrews subsp. baueri,  endemic
 Erica baueri Andrews subsp. gouriquae E.G.H.Oliv. & I.M.Oliv. endemic
 Erica baurii Bolus, endemic
 Erica beatricis Compton, endemic
 Erica benthamiana E.G.H.Oliv. endemic
 Erica bergiana L. indigenous
 Erica bergiana L. var. bergiana,  endemic
 Erica bergiana L. var. glabra J.C.Wendl. endemic
 Erica bergiana L. var. parviflora (Klotzsch) Dulfer, endemic
 Erica berzelioides Guthrie & Bolus, endemic
 Erica bibax Salisb. endemic
 Erica bicolor Thunb. endemic
 Erica binaria E.G.H.Oliv. indigenous
 Erica blaerioides E.G.H.Oliv. indigenous
 Erica blaerioides E.G.H.Oliv. subsp. blaerioides,  endemic
 Erica blaerioides E.G.H.Oliv. subsp. hirsuta E.G.H.Oliv. endemic
 Erica blancheana L.Bolus, accepted as Erica hispidula L. var. hispidula,  present
 Erica blandfordii Andrews, endemic
 Erica blenna Salisb. indigenous
 Erica blenna Salisb. var. blenna,  endemic
 Erica blenna Salisb. var. grandiflora Bolus, endemic
 Erica blesbergensis H.A.Baker, accepted as Erica inamoena Dulfer, present
 Erica bodkinii Guthrie & Bolus, endemic
 Erica bokkeveldia E.G.H.Oliv. endemic
 Erica bolusanthus E.G.H.Oliv. endemic
 Erica bolusiae Salter, indigenous
 Erica bolusiae Salter var. bolusiae,  endemic
 Erica bolusiae Salter var. cyathiformis H.A.Baker, endemic
 Erica borboniifolia Salisb. endemic
 Erica botryoides Dulfer, endemic
 Erica boucheri E.G.H.Oliv. indigenous
 Erica brachialis Salisb. endemic
 Erica brachycentra Benth. endemic
 Erica brachysepala Guthrie & Bolus, endemic
 Erica bracteolaris Lam. endemic
 Erica bredasiana E.G.H.Oliv. indigenous
 Erica brevicaulis Guthrie & Bolus, endemic
 Erica breviflora Dulfer, accepted as Erica plukenetii L. subsp. breviflora (Dulfer) E.G.H.Oliv. & I.M.Oliv. present
 Erica brevifolia Sol. ex Salisb. endemic
 Erica brownii E.G.H.Oliv. endemic
 Erica brownleeae Bolus, endemic
 Erica bruniades L. endemic
 Erica bruniifolia Salisb. indigenous
 Erica bruniifolia Salisb. var. barbigera (Klotzsch ex Benth.) Dulfer, endemic
 Erica bruniifolia Salisb. var. bruniifolia,  endemic
 Erica bruniifolia Salisb. var. solandroides (Andrews) Dulfer, endemic
 Erica bruniifolia Salisb. var. stellata (Lodd.) Dulfer, endemic
 Erica bruniifolia Salisb. var. subglabra Dulfer, endemic
 Erica burchelliana E.G.H.Oliv. endemic
 Erica cabernetea E.G.H.Oliv. endemic
 Erica caespitosa Hilliard & B.L.Burtt, indigenous
 Erica caffra L. indigenous
 Erica caffra L. var. auricularis (Salisb.) Bolus, endemic
 Erica caffra L. var. caffra,  indigenous
 Erica caffrorum Bolus, indigenous
 Erica caffrorum Bolus var. aristula Bolus, endemic
 Erica caffrorum Bolus var. caffrorum,  indigenous
 Erica caffrorum Bolus var. glomerata Bolus, endemic
 Erica caffrorum Bolus var. luxurians Bolus, endemic
 Erica calcareophila E.G.H.Oliv. endemic
 Erica calcicola (E.G.H.Oliv.) E.G.H.Oliv. indigenous
 Erica caledonica A.Spreng. endemic
 Erica calycina L. indigenous
 Erica calycina L. var. calycina,  endemic
 Erica calycina L. var. fragrans (Andrews) Bolus, endemic
 Erica calycina L. var. longibracteata Esterh. & T.M.Salter, endemic
 Erica calycina L. var. periplociflora (Salisb.) Bolus, endemic
 Erica calycina L. var. vespertina (L.f.) Dulfer, endemic
 Erica calycina L. var. viscidiflora (Esterh.) Dulfer, accepted as Erica viscidiflora Esterh. present
 Erica cameronii L.Bolus, endemic
 Erica campanularis Salisb. endemic
 Erica canaliculata Andrews, endemic
 Erica canescens J.C.Wendl. indigenous
 Erica canescens J.C.Wendl. var. canescens,  endemic
 Erica canescens J.C.Wendl. var. micranthera (Bolus) Dulfer, endemic
 Erica capensis Salter, endemic
 Erica capillaris Bartl. indigenous
 Erica capillaris Bartl. var. capillaris,  endemic
 Erica capillaris Bartl. var. poliotes Bolus, endemic
 Erica capitata L. endemic
 Erica caprina E.G.H.Oliv. endemic
 Erica carduifolia Salisb. endemic
 Erica casta Guthrie & Bolus, accepted as Erica regia Bartl. subsp. regia,  indigenous
 Erica casta Guthrie & Bolus var. breviflora Guthrie & Bolus, accepted as Erica regia Bartl. subsp. regia,  present
 Erica caterviflora Salisb. indigenous
 Erica caterviflora Salisb. var. caterviflora,  endemic
 Erica caterviflora Salisb. var. glabrata Benth. endemic
 Erica cavartica E.G.H.Oliv. & I.M.Oliv. endemic
 Erica cederbergensis Compton, endemic
 Erica cedromontana E.G.H.Oliv. endemic
 Erica ceraria E.G.H.Oliv. & I.M.Oliv. endemic
 Erica cereris (Compton) E.G.H.Oliv. endemic
 Erica cerinthoides L. indigenous
 Erica cerinthoides L. var. barbertona (Galpin) Bolus, indigenous
 Erica cerinthoides L. var. cerinthoides,  indigenous
 Erica cernua Montin, endemic
 Erica cetrata E.G.H.Oliv. endemic
 Erica chamissonis Klotzsch ex Benth. indigenous
 Erica chamissonis Klotzsch ex Benth. var. chamissonis,  endemic
 Erica chamissonis Klotzsch ex Benth. var. hirtifolia Dulfer, endemic
 Erica chamissonis Klotzsch ex Benth. var. polyantha (Klotzsch ex Benth.) Dulfer, endemic
 Erica chartacea Guthrie & Bolus, endemic
 Erica chionodes E.G.H.Oliv. endemic
 Erica chionophila Guthrie & Bolus, endemic
 Erica chiroptera E.G.H.Oliv. endemic
 Erica chlamydiflora Salisb. accepted as Erica brevifolia Sol. ex Salisb. present
 Erica chloroloma Lindl. endemic
 Erica chlorosepala Benth. endemic
 Erica chonantha Dulfer, indigenous
 Erica chonantha Dulfer var. chonantha,  endemic
 Erica chonantha Dulfer var. longistyla Dulfer, endemic
 Erica chrysocodon Guthrie & Bolus, endemic
 Erica cincta L.Bolus, endemic
 Erica clavisepala Guthrie & Bolus, endemic
 Erica coacervata H.A.Baker, endemic
 Erica coarctata J.C.Wendl. indigenous
 Erica coarctata J.C.Wendl. var. coarctata,  endemic
 Erica coarctata J.C.Wendl. var. longipes (Bartl.) Bolus, endemic
 Erica coccinea L. indigenous
 Erica coccinea L. subsp. coccinea,  endemic
 Erica coccinea L. subsp. uniflora E.G.H.Oliv. & I.M.Oliv. endemic
 Erica coccinea L. var. inflata H.A.Baker, accepted as Erica melastoma Andrews subsp. melastoma,  present
 Erica coccinea L. var. intermedia (Klotzsch ex Benth.) Dulfer, accepted as Erica intermedia Klotzsch ex Benth. subsp. intermedia,  present
 Erica coccinea L. var. melastoma (Andrews) H.A.Baker, accepted as Erica melastoma Andrews subsp. melastoma,  present
 Erica coccinea L. var. pubescens (Bolus) Dulfer, accepted as Erica coccinea L. subsp. coccinea,  present
 Erica coccinea L. var. willdenovii (Bolus) H.A.Baker, accepted as Erica melastoma Andrews subsp. melastoma,  present
 Erica collina Guthrie & Bolus, endemic
 Erica colorans Andrews, endemic
 Erica colorans Andrews var. breviflora H.A.Baker, accepted as Erica plena L.Bolus, present
 Erica colorans Andrews var. hispidula H.A.Baker, endemic
 Erica columnaris E.G.H.Oliv. endemic
 Erica comata Guthrie & Bolus, endemic
 Erica comptonii T.M.Salter, accepted as Erica banksii Andrews subsp. comptonii (T.M.Salter) E.G.H.Oliv. & I.M.Oliv. present
 Erica condensata Benth. indigenous
 Erica condensata Benth. var. condensata,  endemic
 Erica condensata Benth. var. quadrifida Bolus, endemic
 Erica conferta Andrews, endemic
 Erica conica Lodd. accepted as Erica abietina L. subsp. constantiana E.G.H.Oliv. & I.M.Oliv. present
 Erica conspicua Sol. endemic
 Erica conspicua Sol. subsp. conspicua,  endemic
 Erica conspicua Sol. subsp. roseoflora E.G.H.Oliv. & I.M.Oliv. endemic
 Erica constantia Nois. ex Benth. endemic
 Erica cooperi Bolus, indigenous
 Erica cooperi Bolus var. cooperi,  endemic
 Erica cooperi Bolus var. missionis Bolus, indigenous
 Erica copiosa J.C.Wendl. indigenous
 Erica copiosa J.C.Wendl. var. copiosa,  endemic
 Erica copiosa J.C.Wendl. var. linearisepala Bolus, endemic
 Erica copiosa J.C.Wendl. var. parvisepala Bolus, accepted as Erica florifera (Compton) E.G.H.Oliv. present
 Erica cordata Andrews, indigenous
 Erica cordata Andrews var. arachnoidea (Klotzsch) Dulfer, endemic
 Erica cordata Andrews var. cordata,  endemic
 Erica corifolia L. indigenous
 Erica corifolia L. var. bracteata (Thunb.) Dulfer, endemic
 Erica corifolia L. var. concolor Dulfer, endemic
 Erica corifolia L. var. corifolia,  endemic
 Erica corifolia L. var. erectiuscula (J.C.Wendl.) Dulfer, endemic
 Erica coronanthera Compton, endemic
 Erica coruscans L.Bolus, endemic
 Erica coruscans L.Bolus var. minor L.Bolus, accepted as Erica aristata Andrews var. minor (L.Bolus) Dulfer, endemic
 Erica corydalis Salisb. endemic
 Erica costatisepala H.A.Baker, endemic
 Erica crassisepala Benth. endemic
 Erica crateriformis Guthrie & Bolus, endemic
 Erica cremea Dulfer, endemic
 Erica cristata Dulfer, endemic
 Erica cristiflora Salisb. indigenous
 Erica cristiflora Salisb. var. blanda (Salisb.) Bolus, endemic
 Erica cristiflora Salisb. var. cristiflora,  endemic
 Erica cristiflora Salisb. var. moschata (Andrews) Dulfer, endemic
 Erica croceovirens E.G.H.Oliv. & I.M.Oliv. endemic
 Erica crucistigmatica Dulfer, accepted as Erica gnaphaloides L. present
 Erica cruenta Sol. endemic
 Erica cruenta Sol. var. buccinula Bolus, accepted as Erica cruenta Sol. endemic
 Erica cruenta Sol. var. campanulata Bolus, accepted as Erica elimensis L.Bolus var. elimensis,  endemic
 Erica cruenta Sol. var. mutica Bolus, accepted as Erica cruenta Sol. endemic
 Erica cryptanthera Guthrie & Bolus, endemic
 Erica cubica L. indigenous
 Erica cubica L. var. coronifera Bolus, endemic
 Erica cubica L. var. cubica,  endemic
 Erica cubica L. var. natalensis Bolus, endemic
 Erica cubitans E.G.H.Oliv. indigenous
 Erica cumuliflora Salisb. endemic
 Erica cunoniensis E.G.H.Oliv. endemic
 Erica cupuliflora Dulfer, accepted as Erica florifera (Compton) E.G.H.Oliv. present
 Erica curtophylla Guthrie & Bolus, endemic
 Erica curviflora L. endemic
 Erica curviflora L. var. burchellii (Benth.) Bolus, accepted as Erica curviflora L. endemic
 Erica curviflora L. var. diffusa Bolus, accepted as Erica curviflora L. endemic
 Erica curviflora L. var. splendens (J.C.Wendl.) Dulfer, accepted as Erica conspicua Sol. present
 Erica curviflora L. var. sulcata (Benth.) Dulfer, accepted as Erica curviflora L. endemic
 Erica curviflora L. var. sulphurea (Andrews) Bolus, accepted as Erica curviflora L. endemic
 Erica curviflora L. var. versatilis Bolus, accepted as Erica curviflora L. endemic
 Erica curvifolia Salisb. indigenous
 Erica curvifolia Salisb. var. curvifolia,  endemic
 Erica curvifolia Salisb. var. zeyheri Bolus, endemic
 Erica curvirostris Salisb. indigenous
 Erica curvirostris Salisb. var. curvirostris,  endemic
 Erica curvirostris Salisb. var. longisepala L.Bolus, endemic
 Erica curvistyla (N.E.Br.) E.G.H.Oliv. endemic
 Erica cuscutiformis Dulfer, endemic
 Erica cyathiformis Salisb. indigenous
 Erica cyathiformis Salisb. var. cyathiformis,  endemic
 Erica cyathiformis Salisb. var. orientalis L.Bolus, endemic
 Erica cygnea Salter, endemic
 Erica cylindrica Thunb. endemic
 Erica cymosa E.Mey. ex Benth. indigenous
 Erica cymosa E.Mey. ex Benth. subsp. cymosa,  endemic
 Erica cymosa E.Mey. ex Benth. subsp. grandiflora E.G.H.Oliv. & I.M.Oliv. endemic
 Erica cyrilliflora Salisb. endemic
 Erica daphniflora Salisb. indigenous
 Erica daphniflora Salisb. var. daphniflora,  endemic
 Erica daphniflora Salisb. var. latisepala Bolus, endemic
 Erica daphniflora Salisb. var. leipoldtii Bolus, endemic
 Erica daphniflora Salisb. var. muscari (Andrews) Bolus, endemic
 Erica daphniflora Salisb. var. pedicellata (Klotzsch) Bolus, endemic
 Erica deflexa Sinclair, endemic
 Erica deliciosa H.L.Wendl. ex Benth. accepted as Erica nutans J.C.Wendl. present
 Erica demissa Klotzsch ex Benth. indigenous
 Erica demissa Klotzsch ex Benth. var. crassifolia Dulfer, endemic
 Erica demissa Klotzsch ex Benth. var. demissa,  endemic
 Erica densifolia Willd. endemic
 Erica denticulata L. indigenous
 Erica denticulata L. var. denticulata,  endemic
 Erica denticulata L. var. grandiloba Bolus, endemic
 Erica denticulata L. var. longiflora Bolus, endemic
 Erica denticulata L. var. retusa (Tausch) Dulfer, endemic
 Erica depressa L. endemic
 Erica desmantha Benth. indigenous
 Erica desmantha Benth. var. desmantha,  endemic
 Erica desmantha Benth. var. urceolata H.A.Baker, endemic
 Erica dianthifolia Salisb. endemic
 Erica diaphana Spreng. endemic
 Erica dichrus Spreng. accepted as Erica unicolor J.C.Wendl. subsp. mutica E.G.H.Oliv. & I.M.Oliv. endemic
 Erica diosmifolia Salisb. endemic
 Erica diotiflora Salisb. endemic
 Erica discolor Andrews var. puberula Benth. accepted as Erica discolor Andrews, endemic
 Erica dispar (N.E.Br.) E.G.H.Oliv. endemic
 Erica dissimulans Hilliard & B.L.Burtt, indigenous
 Erica distorta Bartl. endemic
 Erica dodii Guthrie & Bolus, endemic
 Erica dolfiana E.G.H.Oliv. & I.M.Oliv. endemic
 Erica doliiformis Salisb. endemic
 Erica dominans Killick, indigenous
 Erica dracomontana E.G.H.Oliv. indigenous
 Erica drakensbergensis Guthrie & Bolus, indigenous
 Erica dregei E.G.H.Oliv. endemic
 Erica duthieae L.Bolus, endemic
 Erica dysantha Benth. endemic
 Erica ebracteata Bolus, endemic
 Erica eburnea Salter, endemic
 Erica ecklonii E.G.H.Oliv. endemic
 Erica eglandulosa (Klotzsch) E.G.H.Oliv. indigenous
 Erica elimensis L.Bolus, indigenous
 Erica elimensis L.Bolus var. elimensis,  endemic
 Erica elimensis L.Bolus var. parvibracteata L.Bolus, endemic
 Erica ellipticiflora Dulfer, accepted as Erica regerminans L. present
 Erica elsieana (E.G.H.Oliv.) E.G.H.Oliv. endemic
 Erica embothriifolia Salisb. indigenous
 Erica embothriifolia Salisb. var. embothriifolia,  endemic
 Erica embothriifolia Salisb. var. longiflora Bolus, endemic
 Erica embothriifolia Salisb. var. subaequalis Bolus, endemic
 Erica empetrina L. endemic
 Erica equisetifolia Salisb. endemic
 Erica erasmia Dulfer, endemic
 Erica eremioides (MacOwan) E.G.H.Oliv. indigenous
 Erica eremioides (MacOwan) E.G.H.Oliv. subsp. eglandula (N.E.Br.) E.G.H.Oliv. endemic
 Erica eremioides (MacOwan) E.G.H.Oliv. subsp. eremioides,  endemic
 Erica eremioides (MacOwan) E.G.H.Oliv. subsp. pubescens (E.G.H.Oliv.) E.G.H.Oliv. endemic
 Erica ericoides (L.) E.G.H.Oliv. endemic
 Erica erinus (Klotzsch ex Benth.) E.G.H.Oliv. indigenous
 Erica eriocephala Lam. endemic
 Erica eriocodon Bolus, endemic
 Erica eriophoros Guthrie & Bolus, endemic
 Erica esterhuyseniae Compton, endemic
 Erica esterhuyseniae Compton var. tetramera Compton, accepted as Erica esterhuyseniae Compton, present
 Erica esterhuyseniae Compton var. trimera Compton, accepted as Erica oreotragus E.G.H.Oliv. present
 Erica esteriana E.G.H.Oliv. indigenous
 Erica esteriana E.G.H.Oliv. subsp. esteriana,  endemic
 Erica esteriana E.G.H.Oliv. subsp. swartbergensis (E.G.H.Oliv.) E.G.H.Oliv. endemic
 Erica etheliae L.Bolus, endemic
 Erica eugenea Dulfer, endemic
 Erica euryphylla R.C.Turner, endemic
 Erica eustacei L.Bolus, endemic
 Erica evansii (N.E.Br.) E.G.H.Oliv. indigenous
 Erica excavata L.Bolus, endemic
 Erica exleeana E.G.H.Oliv. endemic
 Erica extrusa Compton, endemic
 Erica fairii Bolus, endemic
 Erica fascicularis L.f. indigenous
 Erica fascicularis L.f. var. fascicularis,  endemic
 Erica fascicularis L.f. var. imperialis (Andrews) Bolus, endemic
 Erica fastigiata L. indigenous
 Erica fastigiata L. var. coventryi Bolus, endemic
 Erica fastigiata L. var. fastigiata,  endemic
 Erica fastigiata L. var. immaculata Bolus, endemic
 Erica fastigiata L. var. longituba L.Bolus, endemic
 Erica fausta Salisb. endemic
 Erica feminarum E.G.H.Oliv. endemic
 Erica ferrea P.J.Bergius, endemic
 Erica fervida L.Bolus, accepted as Erica pillansii Bolus subsp. fervida (L.Bolus) E.G.H.Oliv. & I.M.Oliv. endemic
 Erica filamentosa Andrews, endemic
 Erica filamentosa Andrews var. longiflora Bolus, accepted as Erica nematophylla Guthrie & Bolus, present
 Erica filialis E.G.H.Oliv. endemic
 Erica filiformis Salisb. indigenous
 Erica filiformis Salisb. var. filiformis,  endemic
 Erica filiformis Salisb. var. longibracteata Bolus, endemic
 Erica filiformis Salisb. var. maritima Bolus, accepted as Erica radicans (L.Guthrie) E.G.H.Oliv. subsp. schlechteri (N.E.Br.) E.G.H.Oliv. present
 Erica filipendula Benth. indigenous
 Erica filipendula Benth. subsp. filipendula,  endemic
 Erica filipendula Benth. subsp. parva E.G.H.Oliv. & I.M.Oliv. endemic
 Erica filipendula Benth. var. major Bolus, accepted as Erica penduliflora E.G.H.Oliv. present
 Erica fimbriata Andrews, endemic
 Erica flacca E.Mey. ex Benth. endemic
 Erica flanaganii Bolus, indigenous
 Erica flavicoma Bartl. endemic
 Erica flexistyla E.G.H.Oliv. endemic
 Erica floccifera Zahlbr. endemic
 Erica flocciflora Benth. endemic
 Erica florifera (Compton) E.G.H.Oliv. endemic
 Erica foliacea Andrews, indigenous
 Erica foliacea Andrews subsp. foliacea,  endemic
 Erica foliacea Andrews subsp. fulgens (Klotzsch) E.G.H.Oliv. & I.M.Oliv. endemic
 Erica foliacea Andrews var. fulgens (Klotzsch) Bolus, accepted as Erica foliacea Andrews subsp. fulgens (Klotzsch) E.G.H.Oliv. & I.M.Oliv. endemic
 Erica foliacea Andrews var. galpinii (Salter) Dulfer, accepted as Erica galpinii T.M.Salter, present
 Erica fontana L.Bolus, endemic
 Erica formosa Thunb. endemic
 Erica fourcadei L.Bolus, accepted as Erica glandulosa Thunb. subsp. fourcadei (L.Bolus) E.G.H.Oliv. & I.M.Oliv. endemic
 Erica frigida Bolus, indigenous
 Erica fuscescens (Klotzsch) E.G.H.Oliv. endemic
 Erica galgebergensis H.A.Baker, endemic
 Erica gallorum L.Bolus, accepted as Erica viscaria L. subsp. gallorum (L.Bolus) E.G.H.Oliv. & I.M.Oliv. present
 Erica galpinii T.M.Salter, endemic
 Erica garciae E.G.H.Oliv. indigenous
 Erica genistifolia Salisb. endemic
 Erica georgica Guthrie & Bolus, endemic
 Erica gerhardii E.G.H.Oliv. & I.M.Oliv. endemic
 Erica gibbosa Klotzsch ex Benth. accepted as Erica scabriuscula Lodd. present
 Erica gigantea Klotzsch ex Benth. endemic
 Erica gillii Benth. endemic
 Erica gilva J.C.Wendl. accepted as Erica mammosa L. present
 Erica glabella Thunb. indigenous
 Erica glabella Thunb. subsp. glabella,  endemic
 Erica glabella Thunb. subsp. laevis E.G.H.Oliv. endemic
 Erica glabripes L.Bolus, endemic
 Erica glandulifera Klotzsch, endemic
 Erica glandulipila Compton, endemic
 Erica glandulosa Thunb. indigenous
 Erica glandulosa Thunb. subsp. bondiae (Compton) E.G.H.Oliv. & I.M.Oliv. endemic
 Erica glandulosa Thunb. subsp. breviflora (Bolus) E.G.H.Oliv. & I.M.Oliv. endemic
 Erica glandulosa Thunb. subsp. fourcadei (L.Bolus) E.G.H.Oliv. & I.M.Oliv. endemic
 Erica glandulosa Thunb. subsp. glandulosa,  endemic
 Erica glandulosa Thunb. var. bondiae (Compton) Dulfer, accepted as Erica glandulosa Thunb. subsp. bondiae (Compton) E.G.H.Oliv. & I.M.Oliv. endemic
 Erica glandulosa Thunb. var. breviflora Bolus, accepted as Erica glandulosa Thunb. subsp. breviflora (Bolus) E.G.H.Oliv. & I.M.Oliv. endemic
 Erica glaphyra Killick, endemic
 Erica glauca Andrews, indigenous
 Erica glauca Andrews var. elegans (Andrews) Bolus, endemic
 Erica glauca Andrews var. glauca,  endemic
 Erica globiceps (N.E.Br.) E.G.H.Oliv. indigenous
 Erica globiceps (N.E.Br.) E.G.H.Oliv. subsp. consors (N.E.Br.) E.G.H.Oliv. endemic
 Erica globiceps (N.E.Br.) E.G.H.Oliv. subsp. globiceps,  endemic
 Erica globiceps (N.E.Br.) E.G.H.Oliv. subsp. gracilis (Benth.) E.G.H.Oliv. endemic
 Erica globulifera Dulfer, endemic
 Erica glomiflora Salisb. indigenous
 Erica glomiflora Salisb. var. canthariformis (Lodd.) Bolus, endemic
 Erica glomiflora Salisb. var. glomiflora,  endemic
 Erica glumiflora Klotzsch ex Benth. endemic
 Erica glutinosa P.J.Bergius, indigenous
 Erica glutinosa P.J.Bergius var. glutinosa,  endemic
 Erica glutinosa P.J.Bergius var. parviflora Benth. endemic
 Erica gnaphaloides L. endemic
 Erica goatcheriana L.Bolus, indigenous
 Erica goatcheriana L.Bolus var. drakensteinensis L.Bolus, endemic
 Erica goatcheriana L.Bolus var. goatcheriana,  endemic
 Erica goatcheriana L.Bolus var. petrensis L.Bolus, endemic
 Erica gossypioides E.G.H.Oliv. endemic
 Erica gracilipes Guthrie & Bolus, endemic
 Erica gracilis J.C.Wendl. endemic
 Erica grandiflora L.f. accepted as Erica abietina L. subsp. aurantiaca E.G.H.Oliv. & I.M.Oliv. present
 Erica grandiflora L.f. var. exsurgens (Andrews) E.G.H.Oliv. accepted as Erica abietina L. subsp. aurantiaca E.G.H.Oliv. & I.M.Oliv. present
 Erica granulatifolia H.A.Baker, endemic
 Erica granulosa H.A.Baker, endemic
 Erica grata Guthrie & Bolus, endemic
 Erica greyi Guthrie & Bolus, endemic
 Erica grisbrookii Guthrie & Bolus, endemic
 Erica guthriei Bolus, indigenous
 Erica guthriei Bolus var. guthriei,  endemic
 Erica guthriei Bolus var. strictior Bolus, endemic
 Erica gysbertii Guthrie & Bolus, indigenous
 Erica gysbertii Guthrie & Bolus var. ampliata L.Bolus, endemic
 Erica gysbertii Guthrie & Bolus var. gysbertii,  endemic
 Erica gysbertii Guthrie & Bolus var. longiflora L.Bolus, endemic
 Erica haemastoma J.C.Wendl. endemic
 Erica haematocodon T.M.Salter, endemic
 Erica haematosiphon Guthrie & Bolus, endemic
 Erica halicacaba L. endemic
 Erica hameriana L.Bolus, endemic
 Erica hanekomii E.G.H.Oliv. endemic
 Erica hansfordii E.G.H.Oliv. endemic
 Erica harveyana Guthrie & Bolus, endemic
 Erica hebdomadalis E.G.H.Oliv. & I.M.Oliv. endemic
 Erica hebecalyx Benth. accepted as Erica discolor Andrews, endemic
 Erica heleogena T.M.Salter, endemic
 Erica heleophila Guthrie & Bolus, endemic
 Erica hendricksei H.A.Baker, indigenous
 Erica hendricksei H.A.Baker var. alba H.A.Baker, endemic
 Erica hendricksei H.A.Baker var. hendricksei,  endemic
 Erica hermani E.G.H.Oliv. endemic
 Erica heterophylla Guthrie & Bolus, endemic
 Erica hexensis E.G.H.Oliv. endemic
 Erica hibbertii Andrews, indigenous
 Erica hillburttii (E.G.H.Oliv.) E.G.H.Oliv. endemic
 Erica hippurus Compton, endemic
 Erica hirta Thunb. endemic
 Erica hirtiflora Curtis, indigenous
 Erica hirtiflora Curtis var. hirtiflora,  endemic
 Erica hirtiflora Curtis var. minor (Andrews) Benth. endemic
 Erica hispidula L. indigenous
 Erica hispidula L. var. hispidula,  endemic
 Erica hispidula L. var. micrantha Benth. endemic
 Erica hispidula L. var. serpyllifolia (Andrews) Benth. endemic
 Erica hispidula L. var. viscidula (L.Bolus) Dulfer, endemic
 Erica hispiduloides E.G.H.Oliv. endemic
 Erica holosericea Salisb. indigenous
 Erica holosericea Salisb. var. holosericea,  endemic
 Erica holosericea Salisb. var. parviflora Bolus, endemic
 Erica holtii Schweick. indigenous
 Erica hottentotica E.G.H.Oliv. endemic
 Erica humansdorpensis Compton, endemic
 Erica humidicola E.G.H.Oliv. endemic
 Erica humifusa Hibberd ex Salisb. endemic
 Erica ignita E.G.H.Oliv. endemic
 Erica imbricata L. endemic
 Erica inaequalis (N.E.Br.) E.G.H.Oliv. endemic
 Erica inamoena Dulfer, endemic
 Erica incarnata Thunb. endemic
 Erica inclusa H.L.Wendl. ex Benth. endemic
 Erica inconstans Zahlbr. endemic
 Erica inflata Thunb. endemic
 Erica inflaticalyx E.G.H.Oliv. endemic
 Erica infundibuliformis Andrews, endemic
 Erica ingeana E.G.H.Oliv. endemic
 Erica innovans E.G.H.Oliv. endemic
 Erica inops Bolus, accepted as Erica hispidula L. var. hispidula,  present
 Erica inordinata H.A.Baker, endemic
 Erica insignis E.G.H.Oliv. endemic
 Erica insolitanthera H.A.Baker, endemic
 Erica intermedia Klotzsch ex Benth. indigenous
 Erica intermedia Klotzsch ex Benth. subsp. albiflora E.G.H.Oliv. & I.M.Oliv. endemic
 Erica intermedia Klotzsch ex Benth. subsp. intermedia,  endemic
 Erica interrupta (N.E.Br.) E.G.H.Oliv. endemic
 Erica intervallaris Salisb. indigenous
 Erica intervallaris Salisb. var. breviflora Dulfer, accepted as Erica duthieae L.Bolus, present
 Erica intervallaris Salisb. var. grandiflora Bolus, endemic
 Erica intervallaris Salisb. var. intervallaris,  endemic
 Erica intervallaris Salisb. var. trifolia H.A.Baker, endemic
 Erica intonsa L.Bolus, endemic
 Erica intricata H.A.Baker, endemic
 Erica involucrata Klotzsch ex Benth. endemic
 Erica involvens Benth. endemic
 Erica ioniana E.G.H.Oliv. endemic
 Erica irbyana Andrews, endemic
 Erica irregularis Benth. endemic
 Erica irrorata Guthrie & Bolus, endemic
 Erica ixanthera Benth. endemic
 Erica jacksoniana H.A.Baker, endemic
 Erica jananthus E.G.H.Oliv. & I.M.Oliv. endemic
 Erica jasminiflora Salisb. endemic
 Erica jeppei L.Bolus, accepted as Erica harveyana Guthrie & Bolus, present
 Erica jonasiana E.G.H.Oliv. endemic
 Erica jugicola E.G.H.Oliv. & I.M.Oliv. endemic
 Erica juniperina E.G.H.Oliv. endemic
 Erica junonia Bolus, indigenous
 Erica junonia Bolus var. junonia,  endemic
 Erica junonia Bolus var. minor Bolus, endemic
 Erica kammanassieae E.G.H.Oliv. endemic
 Erica karooica E.G.H.Oliv. endemic
 Erica karwyderi E.G.H.Oliv. endemic
 Erica keeromsbergensis H.A.Baker, endemic
 Erica keetii L.Bolus, endemic
 Erica kirstenii E.G.H.Oliv. endemic
 Erica klotzschii (Alm & T.C.E.Fr.) E.G.H.Oliv. endemic
 Erica kogelbergensis E.G.H.Oliv. endemic
 Erica kougabergensis H.A.Baker, indigenous
 Erica kougabergensis H.A.Baker var. kougabergensis,  endemic
 Erica kougabergensis H.A.Baker var. recurvifolia H.A.Baker, endemic
 Erica kraussiana Klotzsch, endemic
 Erica krugeri E.G.H.Oliv. endemic
 Erica labialis Salisb. endemic
 Erica lachnaeifolia Salisb. endemic
 Erica laeta Bartl. endemic
 Erica laevigata Bartl. indigenous
 Erica laevigata Bartl. var. elongata Bolus, endemic
 Erica laevigata Bartl. var. laevigata,  endemic
 Erica lageniformis Salisb. endemic
 Erica lananthera L.Bolus, endemic
 Erica lanata Andrews, endemic
 Erica langebergensis H.A.Baker, endemic
 Erica lanipes Guthrie & Bolus, endemic
 Erica lanuginosa Andrews, endemic
 Erica lasciva Salisb. endemic
 Erica lasiocarpa Guthrie & Bolus, endemic
 Erica lateralis Willd. endemic
 Erica lateriflora E.G.H.Oliv. endemic
 Erica latiflora L.Bolus, endemic
 Erica latifolia Andrews, endemic
 Erica latituba L.Bolus, endemic
 Erica lavandulifolia Salisb. endemic
 Erica lawsonii Andrews, endemic
 Erica lehmannii Klotzsch ex Benth. endemic
 Erica lepidota Rach, endemic
 Erica leptantha Dulfer, endemic
 Erica leptoclada Van Heurck & Mull.Arg. indigenous
 Erica leptoclada Van Heurck & Mull.Arg. var. aristata Bolus, endemic
 Erica leptoclada Van Heurck & Mull.Arg. var. leptoclada,  endemic
 Erica leptopus Benth. indigenous
 Erica leptopus Benth. var. breviloba Bolus, endemic
 Erica leptopus Benth. var. leptopus,  endemic
 Erica leptopus Benth. var. piquetbergensis Bolus, endemic
 Erica leptostachya Guthrie & Bolus, accepted as Erica scoparia L. subsp. scoparia,  present
 Erica leptostachya Guthrie & Bolus var. glabra Dulfer, accepted as Erica natalitia Bolus var. natalitia,  present
 Erica lerouxiae Bolus, endemic
 Erica leucantha Link, endemic
 Erica leucanthera L.f. endemic
 Erica leucodesmia Benth. endemic
 Erica leucopelta Tausch, indigenous
 Erica leucopelta Tausch var. ephebioides Bolus, endemic
 Erica leucopelta Tausch var. leucopelta,  indigenous
 Erica leucopelta Tausch var. luxurians I.Verd. indigenous
 Erica leucopelta Tausch var. pubescens Bolus, endemic
 Erica leucosiphon L.Bolus, endemic
 Erica leucotrachela H.A.Baker, indigenous
 Erica leucotrachela H.A.Baker subsp. leucotrachela,  endemic
 Erica leucotrachela H.A.Baker subsp. monicae E.G.H.Oliv. & I.M.Oliv. endemic
 Erica lignosa H.A.Baker, endemic
 Erica limnophila E.G.H.Oliv. indigenous
 Erica limosa L.Bolus, endemic
 Erica lineata Benth. accepted as Erica plukenetii L. subsp. lineata (Benth.) E.G.H.Oliv. & I.M.Oliv. present
 Erica lithophila E.G.H.Oliv. & I.M.Oliv. endemic
 Erica loganii Compton, endemic
 Erica longiaristata Benth. endemic
 Erica longifolia F.A.Bauer, accepted as Erica viscaria L. subsp. longifolia (F.A.Bauer) E.G.H.Oliv. & I.M.Oliv. present
 Erica longifolia F.A.Bauer subsp. gallorum (Andrews) E.G.H.Oliv. & I.M.Oliv. accepted as Erica viscaria L. subsp. gallorum (L.Bolus) E.G.H.Oliv. & I.M.Oliv. present
 Erica longifolia F.A.Bauer subsp. macrosepala (Andrews) E.G.H.Oliv. & I.M.Oliv. accepted as Erica viscaria L. subsp. macrosepala E.G.H.Oliv. & I.M.Oliv. 
 Erica longifolia F.A.Bauer subsp. pendula E.G.H.Oliv. & I.M.Oliv. accepted as Erica viscaria L. subsp. pendula E.G.H.Oliv. & I.M.Oliv. present
 Erica longifolia F.A.Bauer subsp. pustulata (H.A.Baker) E.G.H.Oliv. & I.M.Oliv. accepted as Erica viscaria L. subsp. pustulata (H.A.Baker) E.G.H.Oliv. & I.M.Oliv. present
 Erica longifolia F.A.Bauer var. amplicata Bolus, accepted as Erica vestita Thunb. present
 Erica longifolia F.A.Bauer var. breviflora Dulfer, accepted as Erica viscaria L. subsp. pustulata (H.A.Baker) E.G.H.Oliv. & I.M.Oliv. present
 Erica longifolia F.A.Bauer var. contracta Bolus, accepted as Erica longifolia F.A.Bauer subsp. longifolia,  present
 Erica longifolia F.A.Bauer var. maritima Bolus, accepted as Erica vestita Thunb. present
 Erica longifolia F.A.Bauer var. squarrosa Bolus, accepted as Erica longifolia F.A.Bauer subsp. longifolia,  present
 Erica longifolia F.A.Bauer var. stricta Dulfer, accepted as Erica longifolia F.A.Bauer subsp. longifolia,  present
 Erica longifolia F.A.Bauer var. viridis (Andrews) Bolus, accepted as Erica viscaria L. subsp. macrosepala E.G.H.Oliv. & I.M.Oliv. present
 Erica longimontana E.G.H.Oliv. endemic
 Erica longipedunculata Lodd. indigenous
 Erica longipedunculata Lodd. var. intermedia (Bolus) Dulfer, endemic
 Erica longipedunculata Lodd. var. longipedunculata,  endemic
 Erica longipedunculata Lodd. var. setifera (Bolus) Dulfer, endemic
 Erica longistyla L.Bolus, indigenous
 Erica longistyla L.Bolus var. appressa Dulfer, endemic
 Erica longistyla L.Bolus var. longistyla,  endemic
 Erica lowryensis Bolus, indigenous
 Erica lowryensis Bolus var. glandulifera Dulfer, endemic
 Erica lowryensis Bolus var. lowryensis,  endemic
 Erica lucida Salisb. indigenous
 Erica lucida Salisb. var. laxa (Andrews) Bolus, endemic
 Erica lucida Salisb. var. lucida,  endemic
 Erica lucida Salisb. var. pauciflora Bolus, endemic
 Erica lutea P.J.Bergius, endemic
 Erica lycopodiastrum Lam. endemic
 Erica macilenta Guthrie & Bolus, endemic
 Erica macowanii Cufino, indigenous
 Erica macowanii Cufino subsp. lanceolata (Bolus) E.G.H.Oliv. & I.M.Oliv. endemic
 Erica macowanii Cufino subsp. macowanii,  endemic
 Erica macroloma Benth. endemic
 Erica macrophylla Klotzsch ex Benth. endemic
 Erica macrotrema Guthrie & Bolus, indigenous
 Erica macrotrema Guthrie & Bolus var. glabripedicellata Dulfer, endemic
 Erica macrotrema Guthrie & Bolus var. macrotrema,  endemic
 Erica maderi Guthrie & Bolus, endemic
 Erica madida E.G.H.Oliv. endemic
 Erica maesta Bolus, indigenous
 Erica maesta Bolus var. longistyla Dulfer, endemic
 Erica maesta Bolus var. maesta,  indigenous
 Erica magistrati E.G.H.Oliv. endemic
 Erica magnisylvae E.G.H.Oliv. endemic
 Erica malmesburiensis E.G.H.Oliv. endemic
 Erica mammosa L. endemic
 Erica manifesta Compton, accepted as Erica umbelliflora Klotzsch ex Benth. indigenous
 Erica manifesta Compton var. campanulata Dulfer, accepted as Erica umbelliflora Klotzsch ex Benth. present
 Erica margaritacea Sol. endemic
 Erica mariae Guthrie & Bolus, accepted as Erica regia Bartl. subsp. mariae (Guthrie & Bolus) E.G.H.Oliv. & I.M.Oliv. present
 Erica marifolia Sol. endemic
 Erica maritima Guthrie & Bolus, endemic
 Erica marlothii Bolus, endemic
 Erica massonii L.f. indigenous
 Erica massonii L.f. var. massonii,  endemic
 Erica massonii L.f. var. minor Benth. endemic
 Erica mauritanica L. endemic
 Erica maximiliani Guthrie & Bolus, endemic
 Erica media Klotzsch ex Benth. accepted as Erica umbelliflora Klotzsch ex Benth. present
 Erica melanacme Guthrie & Bolus, endemic
 Erica melanomontana E.G.H.Oliv. indigenous
 Erica melanthera L. endemic
 Erica melastoma Andrews, indigenous
 Erica melastoma Andrews subsp. melastoma,  endemic
 Erica melastoma Andrews subsp. minor E.G.H.Oliv. & I.M.Oliv. endemic
 Erica merxmuelleri Dulfer, accepted as Erica natalitia Bolus var. natalitia,  present
 Erica micrandra Guthrie & Bolus, endemic
 Erica microcodon Guthrie & Bolus, accepted as Erica mundii Guthrie & Bolus, present
 Erica miniscula E.G.H.Oliv. endemic
 Erica minutissima Klotzsch ex Benth. accepted as Erica quadrangularis Salisb. present
 Erica mira Klotzsch ex Benth. endemic
 Erica mitchellensis Dulfer, endemic
 Erica modesta Salisb. endemic
 Erica mollis Andrews, endemic
 Erica monadelphia Andrews, endemic
 Erica monantha Compton, endemic
 Erica monsoniana L.f. indigenous
 Erica monsoniana L.f. var. exserta Klotzsch, endemic
 Erica monsoniana L.f. var. monsoniana,  endemic
 Erica montis-hominis E.G.H.Oliv. endemic
 Erica mucronata Andrews, endemic
 Erica muirii L.Bolus, endemic
 Erica multiflexuosa E.G.H.Oliv. endemic
 Erica multumbellifera P.J.Bergius, endemic
 Erica mundii Guthrie & Bolus, endemic
 Erica muscosa (Aiton) E.G.H.Oliv. endemic
 Erica myriocodon Guthrie & Bolus, endemic
 Erica nabea Guthrie & Bolus, endemic
 Erica nana Salisb. endemic
 Erica natalensis Dulfer, endemic
 Erica natalitia Bolus, indigenous
 Erica natalitia Bolus var. brevipedicellata Dulfer, accepted as Erica binaria E.G.H.Oliv. present
 Erica natalitia Bolus var. natalitia,  indigenous
 Erica natalitia Bolus var. robusta Dulfer, endemic
 Erica navigatoris E.G.H.Oliv. endemic
 Erica nematophylla Guthrie & Bolus, endemic
 Erica nemorosa Klotzsch ex Benth. endemic
 Erica nervata Guthrie & Bolus, endemic
 Erica nevillei L.Bolus, endemic
 Erica newdigateae Dulfer, endemic
 Erica nidularia Lodd. indigenous
 Erica nigrimontana Guthrie & Bolus, endemic
 Erica nivea Sinclair, endemic
 Erica niveniana E.G.H.Oliv. endemic
 Erica notholeeana (E.G.H.Oliv.) E.G.H.Oliv. endemic
 Erica nubigena Bolus, endemic
 Erica nudiflora L. endemic
 Erica nutans J.C.Wendl. endemic
 Erica oakesiorum E.G.H.Oliv. endemic
 Erica oatesii Rolfe, indigenous
 Erica oatesii Rolfe var. latifolia Bolus, endemic
 Erica oatesii Rolfe var. oatesii,  indigenous
 Erica obconica H.A.Baker, endemic
 Erica obliqua Thunb. endemic
 Erica oblongiflora Benth. endemic
 Erica obtusata Klotzsch ex Benth. endemic
 Erica occulta E.G.H.Oliv. endemic
 Erica ocellata Guthrie & Bolus, endemic
 Erica octonaria L.Bolus, endemic
 Erica odorata Andrews, endemic
 Erica oligantha Guthrie & Bolus, endemic
 Erica oliveri H.A.Baker, endemic
 Erica omninoglabra H.A.Baker, endemic
 Erica onosmiflora Salisb. accepted as Erica viscaria L. subsp. macrosepala E.G.H.Oliv. & I.M.Oliv. present
 Erica onusta Guthrie & Bolus, endemic
 Erica oophylla Benth. endemic
 Erica opulenta (J.C.Wendl. ex Klotzsch) Benth. endemic
 Erica orculiflora Dulfer, endemic
 Erica oreina Dulfer, accepted as Erica lateralis Willd. present
 Erica oreophila Guthrie & Bolus, endemic
 Erica oreotragus E.G.H.Oliv. endemic
 Erica oresigena Bolus, endemic
 Erica oresigena Bolus var. intermedia Bolus, accepted as Erica oresigena Bolus, present
 Erica oresigena Bolus var. mollipila Bolus, accepted as Erica taylorii E.G.H.Oliv. present
 Erica orientalis R.A.Dyer, endemic
 Erica orthiocola E.G.H.Oliv. endemic
 Erica ostiaria Compton, endemic
 Erica outeniquae (Compton) E.G.H.Oliv. endemic
 Erica ovina Klotzsch, indigenous
 Erica ovina Klotzsch var. ovina,  endemic
 Erica ovina Klotzsch var. purpurea Bolus, endemic
 Erica oxyandra Guthrie & Bolus, endemic
 Erica oxycoccifolia Salisb. endemic
 Erica oxysepala Guthrie & Bolus, endemic
 Erica pageana L.Bolus, endemic
 Erica palliiflora Salisb. endemic
 Erica paludicola L.Bolus, endemic
 Erica paniculata L. endemic
 Erica pannosa Salisb. indigenous
 Erica papyracea Guthrie & Bolus, endemic
 Erica parilis Salisb. indigenous
 Erica parilis Salisb. var. parilis,  endemic
 Erica parilis Salisb. var. parviflora Benth. endemic
 Erica parviflora L. indigenous
 Erica parviflora L. var. exigua (Salisb.) Bolus, endemic
 Erica parviflora L. var. glabra Compton, endemic
 Erica parviflora L. var. hispida Bolus, endemic
 Erica parviflora L. var. inermis (Klotzsch) Bolus, endemic
 Erica parviflora L. var. parviflora,  endemic
 Erica parviflora L. var. puberula (Bartl.) Bolus, endemic
 Erica parviflora L. var. ternifolia Bolus, endemic
 Erica parviporandra E.G.H.Oliv. endemic
 Erica parvula Guthrie & Bolus, accepted as Erica equisetifolia Salisb. present
 Erica parvulisepala H.A.Baker, accepted as Erica xanthina Guthrie & Bolus, present
 Erica passerinae Montin, endemic
 Erica passerinoides (Bolus) E.G.H.Oliv. endemic
 Erica patersonia Andrews, endemic
 Erica patersonii L.Bolus, accepted as Erica viscaria L. subsp. pustulata (H.A.Baker) E.G.H.Oliv. & I.M.Oliv. present
 Erica paucifolia (J.C.Wendl.) E.G.H.Oliv. indigenous
 Erica paucifolia (J.C.Wendl.) E.G.H.Oliv. subsp. ciliata (Klotzsch) E.G.H.Oliv. endemic
 Erica paucifolia (J.C.Wendl.) E.G.H.Oliv. subsp. paucifolia,  endemic
 Erica paucifolia (J.C.Wendl.) E.G.H.Oliv. subsp. squarrosa (Benth.) E.G.H.Oliv. endemic
 Erica pauciovulata H.A.Baker, endemic
 Erica pearsoniana L.Bolus, endemic
 Erica pectinifolia Salisb. indigenous
 Erica pectinifolia Salisb. var. oblongifolia Dulfer, endemic
 Erica pectinifolia Salisb. var. pectinifolia,  endemic
 Erica pellucida Sol. ex Salisb. endemic
 Erica peltata Andrews, endemic
 Erica penduliflora E.G.H.Oliv. endemic
 Erica penicilliformis Salisb. indigenous
 Erica penicilliformis Salisb. var. chrysantha (Klotzsch ex Benth.) Dulfer, endemic
 Erica penicilliformis Salisb. var. penicilliformis,  endemic
 Erica perlata Sinclair, endemic
 Erica permutata Dulfer, endemic
 Erica perplexa E.G.H.Oliv. endemic
 Erica perspicua J.C.Wendl. indigenous
 Erica perspicua J.C.Wendl. subsp. latifolia (Benth.) E.G.H.Oliv. & I.M.Oliv. endemic
 Erica perspicua J.C.Wendl. subsp. perspicua,  endemic
 Erica perspicua J.C.Wendl. var. lanceolata Bolus, accepted as Erica macowanii Cufino subsp. lanceolata (Bolus) E.G.H.Oliv. & I.M.Oliv. endemic
 Erica perspicua J.C.Wendl. var. latifolia Bolus, accepted as Erica perspicua J.C.Wendl. subsp. latifolia (Benth.) E.G.H.Oliv. & I.M.Oliv. endemic
 Erica petiolaris Lam. endemic
 Erica petraea Benth. endemic
 Erica petricola E.G.H.Oliv. endemic
 Erica petrophila L.Bolus, endemic
 Erica petrusiana E.G.H.Oliv. & I.M.Oliv. endemic
 Erica peziza Lodd. endemic
 Erica phacelanthera E.G.H.Oliv. endemic
 Erica phaeocarpa (N.E.Br.) E.G.H.Oliv. endemic
 Erica philippioides Compton, endemic
 Erica phillipsii L.Bolus, endemic
 Erica phylicifolia Salisb. accepted as Erica abietina L. subsp. atrorosea E.G.H.Oliv. & I.M.Oliv. present
 Erica physantha Benth. endemic
 Erica physodes L. endemic
 Erica physophylla Benth. endemic
 Erica pilaarkopensis H.A.Baker, endemic
 Erica pillansii Bolus, indigenous
 Erica pillansii Bolus subsp. fervida (L.Bolus) E.G.H.Oliv. & I.M.Oliv. endemic
 Erica pillansii Bolus subsp. pillansii,  endemic
 Erica pilosiflora E.G.H.Oliv. indigenous
 Erica pilosiflora E.G.H.Oliv. subsp. pilosiflora,  endemic
 Erica pilosiflora E.G.H.Oliv. subsp. purpurea E.G.H.Oliv. endemic
 Erica pilulifera L. endemic
 Erica pinea Thunb. endemic
 Erica pinea Thunb. var. argentiflora (Andrews) Bolus, accepted as Erica pinea Thunb. present
 Erica pinea Thunb. var. viscosissima (Benth.) Bolus, accepted as Erica pinea Thunb. present
 Erica piquetbergensis (N.E.Br.) E.G.H.Oliv. endemic
 Erica placentiflora Salisb. endemic
 Erica planifolia L. indigenous
 Erica planifolia L. var. calycina Bolus, endemic
 Erica planifolia L. var. planifolia,  endemic
 Erica platycalyx E.G.H.Oliv. endemic
 Erica plena L.Bolus, endemic
 Erica plukenetii L. indigenous
 Erica plukenetii L. subsp. bredensis E.G.H.Oliv. & I.M.Oliv. endemic
 Erica plukenetii L. subsp. breviflora (Dulfer) E.G.H.Oliv. & I.M.Oliv. endemic
 Erica plukenetii L. subsp. lineata (Benth.) E.G.H.Oliv. & I.M.Oliv. endemic
 Erica plukenetii L. subsp. penicellata (Andrews) E.G.H.Oliv. & I.M.Oliv. endemic
 Erica plukenetii L. subsp. plukenetii,  endemic
 Erica plukenetii L. var. bicarinata Bolus, accepted as Erica plukenetii L. subsp. penicellata (Andrews) E.G.H.Oliv. & I.M.Oliv. present
 Erica plukenetii L. var. brevifolia Bolus, accepted as Erica plukenetii L. subsp. plukenetii,  present
 Erica plumigera Bartl. endemic
 Erica plumosa Thunb. endemic
 Erica podophylla Benth. endemic
 Erica pogonanthera Bartl. endemic
 Erica polifolia Salisb. ex Benth. indigenous
 Erica polifolia Salisb. ex Benth. var. angustata Bolus, endemic
 Erica polifolia Salisb. ex Benth. var. polifolia,  endemic
 Erica polycoma Benth. endemic
 Erica portenschlagiana Dulfer, endemic
 Erica porteri Compton, accepted as Erica thomae L.Bolus, present
 Erica praecox Klotzsch, endemic
 Erica praenitens Tausch, endemic
 Erica primulina Bolus, accepted as Erica viridiflora Andrews subsp. primulina (Bolus) E.G.H.Oliv. & I.M.Oliv. present
 Erica priorii Guthrie & Bolus, endemic
 Erica procaviana (E.G.H.Oliv.) E.G.H.Oliv. endemic
 Erica prolata E.G.H.Oliv. & I.M.Oliv. endemic
 Erica propendens Andrews, endemic
 Erica propinqua Guthrie & Bolus, endemic
 Erica pseudocalycina Compton, endemic
 Erica psittacina E.G.H.Oliv. & I.M.Oliv. indigenous
 Erica puberuliflora E.G.H.Oliv. endemic
 Erica pubescens L. indigenous
 Erica pubescens L. var. glabrifolia Dulfer, endemic
 Erica pubescens L. var. pubescens,  endemic
 Erica pubigera Salisb. endemic
 Erica pudens H.A.Baker, endemic
 Erica pulchella Houtt. indigenous
 Erica pulchella Houtt. var. major T.M.Salter, endemic
 Erica pulchella Houtt. var. pulchella,  endemic
 Erica pulchelliflora E.G.H.Oliv. endemic
 Erica pulvinata Guthrie & Bolus, endemic
 Erica pumila Andrews, endemic
 Erica purgatoriensis H.A.Baker, endemic
 Erica pustulata H.A.Baker, accepted as Erica viscaria L. subsp. pustulata (H.A.Baker) E.G.H.Oliv. & I.M.Oliv. present
 Erica pycnantha Benth. endemic
 Erica pyramidalis Sol. indigenous
 Erica pyramidalis Sol. var. pyramidalis,  endemic
 Erica pyramidalis Sol. var. vernalis (Lodd.) Benth. endemic
 Erica pyrantha L.Bolus, accepted as Erica pillansii Bolus subsp. fervida (L.Bolus) E.G.H.Oliv. & I.M.Oliv. present
 Erica pyxidiflora Salisb. endemic
 Erica quadrangularis Salisb. endemic
 Erica quadrifida (Benth.) E.G.H.Oliv. endemic
 Erica quadrisulcata L.Bolus, endemic
 Erica racemosa Thunb. indigenous
 Erica racemosa Thunb. var. aristata L.Bolus, endemic
 Erica racemosa Thunb. var. racemosa,  endemic
 Erica radicans (L.Guthrie) E.G.H.Oliv. indigenous
 Erica radicans (L.Guthrie) E.G.H.Oliv. subsp. radicans,  endemic
 Erica radicans (L.Guthrie) E.G.H.Oliv. subsp. schlechteri (N.E.Br.) E.G.H.Oliv. endemic
 Erica recta Bolus, endemic
 Erica recurvata Andrews, accepted as Erica cumuliflora Salisb. present
 Erica recurvifolia E.G.H.Oliv. endemic
 Erica reenensis Zahlbr. indigenous
 Erica regerminans L. endemic
 Erica regia Bartl. indigenous
 Erica regia Bartl. subsp. mariae (Guthrie & Bolus) E.G.H.Oliv. & I.M.Oliv. endemic
 Erica regia Bartl. subsp. regia,  endemic
 Erica regia Bartl. var. variegata Bolus, accepted as Erica regia Bartl. subsp. regia,  present
 Erica regia Bartl. var. williana Bolus, accepted as Erica regia Bartl. subsp. regia,  present
 Erica rehmii Dulfer, endemic
 Erica remota (N.E.Br.) E.G.H.Oliv. endemic
 Erica retorta Montin, endemic
 Erica revoluta (Bolus) L.E.Davidson, indigenous
 Erica rhodantha Guthrie & Bolus, endemic
 Erica rhodopis (Bolus) Guthrie & Bolus, endemic
 Erica rhopalantha Dulfer, indigenous
 Erica rhopalantha Dulfer var. delapsa (Bolus) Dulfer, endemic
 Erica rhopalantha Dulfer var. rhopalantha,  endemic
 Erica ribisaria Guthrie & Bolus, endemic
 Erica richardii E.G.H.Oliv. & I.M.Oliv. endemic
 Erica rigidula (N.E.Br.) E.G.H.Oliv. endemic
 Erica rimarum E.G.H.Oliv. endemic
 Erica riparia H.A.Baker, endemic
 Erica rivularis L.E.Davidson, endemic
 Erica rosacea (L.Guthrie) E.G.H.Oliv. indigenous
 Erica rosacea (L.Guthrie) E.G.H.Oliv. subsp. glabrata E.G.H.Oliv. endemic
 Erica rosacea (L.Guthrie) E.G.H.Oliv. subsp. rosacea,  endemic
 Erica roseoloba E.G.H.Oliv. endemic
 Erica rubens Thunb. endemic
 Erica rubiginosa Dulfer, indigenous
 Erica rubiginosa Dulfer var. caespitosa (Bolus) Dulfer, endemic
 Erica rubiginosa Dulfer var. rubiginosa,  endemic
 Erica rudolfii Bolus, endemic
 Erica rufescens Klotzsch, endemic
 Erica rugata E.G.H.Oliv. endemic
 Erica rupicola Klotzsch, endemic
 Erica russakiana E.G.H.Oliv. endemic
 Erica rusticula E.G.H.Oliv. endemic
 Erica sacciflora Salisb. endemic
 Erica sagittata Klotzsch ex Benth. endemic
 Erica salax Salisb. endemic
 Erica salicina E.G.H.Oliv. endemic
 Erica salteri L.Bolus, endemic
 Erica saptouensis E.G.H.Oliv. endemic
 Erica savileae Andrews, indigenous
 Erica savileae Andrews var. grandiflora Bolus, endemic
 Erica savileae Andrews var. mutica L.Bolus, endemic
 Erica savileae Andrews var. savileae,  endemic
 Erica saxicola Guthrie & Bolus, endemic
 Erica saxigena Dulfer, endemic
 Erica scabriuscula Lodd. endemic
 Erica schelpeorum E.G.H.Oliv. & I.M.Oliv. endemic
 Erica schlechteri Bolus, indigenous
 Erica schumannii E.G.H.Oliv. indigenous
 Erica scytophylla Guthrie & Bolus, endemic
 Erica selaginifolia Salisb. endemic
 Erica senilis Klotzsch ex Benth. endemic
 Erica senilis Klotzsch ex Benth. var. australis Dulfer, accepted as Erica tegetiformis E.G.H.Oliv. present
 Erica seriphiifolia Salisb. endemic
 Erica serrata Thunb. endemic
 Erica serratifolia Andrews var. subnuda L.Bolus, accepted as Erica kogelbergensis E.G.H.Oliv. present
 Erica sessiliflora L.f. endemic
 Erica sessiliflora L.f. var. clavaeflora (Salisb.) Bolus, accepted as Erica sessiliflora L.f. present
 Erica sessiliflora L.f. var. oblanceolata Bolus, accepted as Erica sessiliflora L.f. present
 Erica sessiliflora L.f. var. sceptriformis (Salisb.) Bolus, accepted as Erica sessiliflora L.f. present
 Erica setacea Andrews, endemic
 Erica setociliata H.A.Baker, endemic
 Erica setosa Bartl. endemic
 Erica setulosa Benth. endemic
 Erica sexfaria Aiton, endemic
 Erica shannonii Andrews, endemic
 Erica sicifolia Salisb. endemic
 Erica simii (S.Moore) E.G.H.Oliv. indigenous
 Erica similis (N.E.Br.) E.G.H.Oliv. endemic
 Erica simulans Dulfer, indigenous
 Erica simulans Dulfer var. simulans,  endemic
 Erica simulans Dulfer var. tetragona (Bolus) Dulfer, endemic
 Erica simulans Dulfer var. trivialis (Klotzsch) Dulfer, endemic
 Erica sitiens Klotzsch, endemic
 Erica sociorum L.Bolus, endemic
 Erica solandra Andrews var. mollis Dulfer, accepted as Erica setulosa Benth. present
 Erica solandri Andrews, endemic
 Erica sonderiana Guthrie & Bolus, endemic
 Erica sonora Compton, accepted as Erica aristifolia Benth. present
 Erica sparrmannii L.f. endemic
 Erica sparsa Lodd. indigenous
 Erica sparsa Lodd. var. glanduloso-pedicellata Dulfer, endemic
 Erica sparsa Lodd. var. sparsa,  endemic
 Erica speciosa Andrews, accepted as Erica discolor Andrews, present
 Erica spectabilis Klotzsch ex Benth. endemic
 Erica sperata E.G.H.Oliv. endemic
 Erica sphaerocephala J.C.Wendl. ex Benth. endemic
 Erica sphaeroidea Dulfer, accepted as Erica hirta Thunb. indigenous
 Erica sphaeroidea Dulfer var. subterminalis (Klotzsch) Dulfer, accepted as Erica hirta Thunb. present
 Erica spumosa L. endemic
 Erica squarrosa Salisb. endemic
 Erica stagnalis Salisb. endemic
 Erica stagnalis Salisb. subsp. minor E.G.H.Oliv. & I.M.Oliv. endemic
 Erica stagnalis Salisb. subsp. stagnalis,  endemic
 Erica steinbergiana H.L.Wendl. ex Klotzsch, indigenous
 Erica steinbergiana H.L.Wendl. ex Klotzsch var. abbreviata Bolus, endemic
 Erica steinbergiana H.L.Wendl. ex Klotzsch var. steinbergiana,  endemic
 Erica stenantha Klotzsch ex Benth. endemic
 Erica stokoeanthus E.G.H.Oliv. endemic
 Erica stokoei L.Bolus, endemic
 Erica straussiana Gilg, indigenous
 Erica strigilifolia Salisb. indigenous
 Erica strigilifolia Salisb. var. rosea Bolus, endemic
 Erica strigilifolia Salisb. var. strigilifolia,  endemic
 Erica strigosa Sol. endemic
 Erica stylaris Spreng. endemic
 Erica subcapitata (N.E.Br.) E.G.H.Oliv. endemic
 Erica subdivaricata P.J.Bergius, endemic
 Erica subimbricata Compton, accepted as Erica imbricata L. present
 Erica subulata J.C.Wendl. endemic
 Erica subverticillaris Diels ex Guthrie & Bolus, endemic
 Erica suffulta J.C.Wendl. ex Benth. endemic
 Erica symonsii L.Bolus, accepted as Erica straussiana Gilg, present
 Erica syngenesia Compton, endemic
 Erica tarantulae E.G.H.Oliv. indigenous
 Erica taxifolia Aiton, endemic
 Erica taylorii E.G.H.Oliv. endemic
 Erica tegetiformis E.G.H.Oliv. endemic
 Erica tegulifolia Salisb. endemic
 Erica tenax L.Bolus, accepted as Erica thomae L.Bolus, present
 Erica tenella Andrews, indigenous
 Erica tenella Andrews var. gracilior Bolus, endemic
 Erica tenella Andrews var. tenella,  endemic
 Erica tenuicaulis Klotzsch ex Benth. endemic
 Erica tenuifolia L. endemic
 Erica tenuipes Guthrie & Bolus, endemic
 Erica tenuis Salisb. endemic
 Erica terniflora E.G.H.Oliv. indigenous
 Erica tetragona L.f. endemic
 Erica tetrathecoides Benth. endemic
 Erica thamnoides E.G.H.Oliv. endemic
 Erica thimifolia J.C.Wendl. endemic
 Erica thodei Guthrie & Bolus, indigenous
 Erica thomae L.Bolus, endemic
 Erica thomae L.Bolus var. brevisepala L.Bolus, accepted as Erica thomae L.Bolus, present
 Erica thunbergii Montin, indigenous
 Erica thunbergii Montin var. celsiana (Lodd.) Benth. endemic
 Erica thunbergii Montin var. thunbergii,  endemic
 Erica tomentosa Salisb. endemic
 Erica toringbergensis H.A.Baker, endemic
 Erica totta Thunb. endemic
 Erica trachysantha Bolus, endemic
 Erica tradouwensis Compton, endemic
 Erica tragomontana R.C.Turner, endemic
 Erica tragulifera Salisb. endemic
 Erica transparens P.J.Bergius, endemic
 Erica triceps Link, endemic
 Erica trichadenia Bolus, endemic
 Erica trichoclada Guthrie & Bolus, endemic
 Erica trichophora Benth. endemic
 Erica trichophylla Benth. endemic
 Erica trichostigma Salter, endemic
 Erica trichroma Benth. indigenous
 Erica trichroma Benth. var. imbricata Bolus, endemic
 Erica trichroma Benth. var. trichroma,  endemic
 Erica triflora L. indigenous
 Erica triflora L. var. rosea Benth. endemic
 Erica triflora L. var. triflora,  endemic
 Erica tristis Bartl. indigenous
 Erica truncata L.Bolus, endemic
 Erica tubercularis Salisb. endemic
 Erica tumida Ker Gawl. indigenous
 Erica tumida Ker Gawl. var. minor Bolus, endemic
 Erica tumida Ker Gawl. var. tumida,  endemic
 Erica turbiniflora Salisb. accepted as Erica capensis Salter, indigenous
 Erica turbiniflora Salisb. var. aristata Bolus, accepted as Erica capensis Salter, present
 Erica turgida Salisb. endemic
 Erica turmalis Salisb. indigenous
 Erica turneri E.G.H.Oliv. endemic
 Erica turrisbabylonica H.A.Baker, endemic
 Erica tysonii Bolus, indigenous
 Erica tysonii Bolus var. krookii Zahlbr. endemic
 Erica tysonii Bolus var. tysonii,  endemic
 Erica uberiflora E.G.H.Oliv. endemic
 Erica umbelliflora Klotzsch ex Benth. endemic
 Erica umbonata Compton, accepted as Erica glandulipila Compton, present
 Erica umbratica E.G.H.Oliv. & I.M.Oliv. endemic
 Erica unicolor J.C.Wendl. endemic
 Erica unicolor J.C.Wendl. subsp. georgensis E.G.H.Oliv. & I.M.Oliv. endemic
 Erica unicolor J.C.Wendl. subsp. mutica E.G.H.Oliv. & I.M.Oliv. endemic
 Erica unicolor J.C.Wendl. subsp. unicolor,  endemic
 Erica unilateralis Klotzsch ex Benth. endemic
 Erica urceolata (Klotzsch) E.G.H.Oliv. endemic
 Erica urna-viridis Bolus, endemic
 Erica ustulescens Guthrie & Bolus, endemic
 Erica utriculosa L.Bolus, endemic
 Erica uysii H.A.Baker, endemic
 Erica valida H.A.Baker, endemic
 Erica vallis-aranearum E.G.H.Oliv. endemic
 Erica vallis-fluminis E.G.H.Oliv. endemic
 Erica vallis-gratiae Guthrie & Bolus, endemic
 Erica vanheurckii Mull.Arg. endemic
 Erica varderi L.Bolus, endemic
 Erica velatiflora E.G.H.Oliv. endemic
 Erica velitaris Salisb. indigenous
 Erica velitaris Salisb. var. hemisphaerica Bolus, endemic
 Erica velitaris Salisb. var. parvibracteata L.Bolus, endemic
 Erica velitaris Salisb. var. velitaris,  endemic
 Erica ventricosa Thunb. indigenous
 Erica ventricosa Thunb. var. meyeriana Dulfer, endemic
 Erica ventricosa Thunb. var. ventricosa,  endemic
 Erica venustiflora E.G.H.Oliv. indigenous
 Erica venustiflora E.G.H.Oliv. subsp. glandulosa E.G.H.Oliv. endemic
 Erica venustiflora E.G.H.Oliv. subsp. venustiflora,  endemic
 Erica verecunda Salisb. endemic
 Erica vernicosa E.G.H.Oliv. endemic
 Erica versicolor Andrews, endemic
 Erica versicolor Andrews var. ciliata J.C.Wendl. accepted as Erica versicolor Andrews, endemic
 Erica versicolor Andrews var. longiflora Andrews, accepted as Erica versicolor Andrews, endemic
 Erica versicolor Andrews var. monticola Bolus, accepted as Erica versicolor Andrews, endemic
 Erica verticillata P.J.Bergius, endemic
 Erica vestiflua Salisb. accepted as Erica melastoma Andrews subsp. melastoma,  present
 Erica vestita Thunb. endemic
 Erica vestita Thunb. var. fulgida Andrews, accepted as Erica vestita Thunb. present
 Erica villosa J.C.Wendl. endemic
 Erica viminalis E.G.H.Oliv. accepted as Erica salicina E.G.H.Oliv. indigenous
 Erica virginalis Klotzsch ex Benth. endemic
 Erica viridescens Lodd. accepted as Erica unicolor J.C.Wendl. subsp. unicolor,  present
 Erica viridescens Lodd. var. latituba (L.Bolus) Dulfer, accepted as Erica latituba L.Bolus, present
 Erica viridiflora Andrews, indigenous
 Erica viridiflora Andrews subsp. primulina (Bolus) E.G.H.Oliv. & I.M.Oliv. endemic
 Erica viridiflora Andrews subsp. redacta E.G.H.Oliv. & I.M.Oliv. endemic
 Erica viridiflora Andrews subsp. viridiflora,  endemic
 Erica viridimontana E.G.H.Oliv. & I.M.Oliv. endemic
 Erica viridimontana E.G.H.Oliv. & I.M.Oliv. subsp. nivicola E.G.H.Oliv. & I.M.Oliv. endemic
 Erica viridimontana E.G.H.Oliv. & I.M.Oliv. subsp. viridimontana,  endemic
 Erica viscaria L. indigenous
 Erica viscaria L. subsp. gallorum (L.Bolus) E.G.H.Oliv. & I.M.Oliv. endemic
 Erica viscaria L. subsp. longifolia (F.A.Bauer) E.G.H.Oliv. & I.M.Oliv. endemic
 Erica viscaria L. subsp. macrosepala E.G.H.Oliv. & I.M.Oliv. endemic
 Erica viscaria L. subsp. pendula E.G.H.Oliv. & I.M.Oliv. endemic
 Erica viscaria L. subsp. pustulata (H.A.Baker) E.G.H.Oliv. & I.M.Oliv. endemic
 Erica viscaria L. subsp. viscaria,  endemic
 Erica viscaria L. var. decora (Andrews) Bolus, accepted as Erica viscaria L. subsp. viscaria,  present
 Erica viscaria L. var. hispida Bolus, accepted as Erica viscaria L. subsp. gallorum (L.Bolus) E.G.H.Oliv. & I.M.Oliv. present
 Erica viscidiflora Esterh. endemic
 Erica viscosissima E.G.H.Oliv. endemic
 Erica vlokii E.G.H.Oliv. endemic
 Erica vogelpoelii H.A.Baker, endemic
 Erica walkeri Andrews, indigenous
 Erica walkeri Andrews var. praestans (Andrews) Bolus, endemic
 Erica walkeri Andrews var. walkeri,  endemic
 Erica wendlandiana Klotzsch, endemic
 Erica williamsiorum E.G.H.Oliv. endemic
 Erica winteri H.A.Baker, endemic
 Erica wittebergensis Dulfer, endemic
 Erica woodii Bolus, indigenous
 Erica woodii Bolus subsp. platyura Hilliard & B.L.Burtt, endemic
 Erica woodii Bolus var. robusta Dulfer, endemic
 Erica woodii Bolus var. woodii,  indigenous
 Erica wyliei Bolus, endemic
 Erica x flavisepala Guthrie & Bolus, endemic
 Erica xanthina Guthrie & Bolus, endemic
 Erica xeranthemifolia Salisb. endemic
 Erica xerophila Bolus, accepted as Erica wendlandiana Klotzsch, present
 Erica zebrensis Compton, endemic
 Erica zeyheriana (Klotzsch) E.G.H.Oliv. endemic
 Erica zitzikammensis Dulfer, indigenous
 Erica zitzikammensis Dulfer var. glutinosa Dulfer, endemic*
 Erica zitzikammensis Dulfer var. zitzikammensis,  endemic
 Erica zwartbergensis Bolus, endemic

Ericinella
Genus Ericinella:
 Ericinella hillburttii E.G.H.Oliv. accepted as Erica hillburttii (E.G.H.Oliv.) E.G.H.Oliv. present
 Ericinella multiflora Klotzsch, accepted as Erica amatolensis E.G.H.Oliv. present
 Ericinella passerinoides Bolus, accepted as Erica passerinoides (Bolus) E.G.H.Oliv. present

Grisebachia
Genus Grisebachia:
 Grisebachia ciliaris (L.f.) Klotzsch subsp. bolusii (N.E.Br.) E.G.H.Oliv. accepted as Erica plumosa Thunb. present
 Grisebachia ciliaris (L.f.) Klotzsch subsp. ciliaris,  accepted as Erica plumosa Thunb. present
 Grisebachia ciliaris (L.f.) Klotzsch subsp. ciliciiflora (Salisb.) E.G.H.Oliv. accepted as Erica plumosa Thunb. present
 Grisebachia ciliaris (L.f.) Klotzsch subsp. involuta (Klotzsch) E.G.H.Oliv. accepted as Erica plumosa Thunb. present
 Grisebachia ciliaris (L.f.) Klotzsch subsp. multiglandulosa E.G.H.Oliv. accepted as Erica plumosa Thunb. present
 Grisebachia incana (Bartl.) Klotzsch, accepted as Erica plumosa Thunb. present
 Grisebachia minutiflora N.E.Br. subsp. minutiflora,  accepted as Erica caprina E.G.H.Oliv. present
 Grisebachia minutiflora N.E.Br. subsp. nodiflora (N.E.Br.) E.G.H.Oliv. accepted as Erica caprina E.G.H.Oliv. present
 Grisebachia nivenii N.E.Br. accepted as Erica plumosa Thunb. present
 Grisebachia parviflora (Klotzsch) Druce subsp. eglandula (N.E.Br.) E.G.H.Oliv. accepted as Erica eremioides (MacOwan) E.G.H.Oliv. subsp. eglandula (N.E.Br.) E.G.H.Oliv. present
 Grisebachia parviflora (Klotzsch) Druce subsp. parviflora,  accepted as Erica eremioides (MacOwan) E.G.H.Oliv. subsp. eremioides,  present
 Grisebachia parviflora (Klotzsch) Druce subsp. pubescens E.G.H.Oliv. accepted as Erica eremioides (MacOwan) E.G.H.Oliv. subsp. pubescens (E.G.H.Oliv.) E.G.H.Oliv. present
 Grisebachia plumosa (Thunb.) Klotzsch subsp. eciliata E.G.H.Oliv. accepted as Erica plumosa Thunb. present
 Grisebachia plumosa (Thunb.) Klotzsch subsp. hirta (Klotzsch) E.G.H.Oliv. accepted as Erica plumosa Thunb. present
 Grisebachia plumosa (Thunb.) Klotzsch subsp. hispida (Klotzsch) E.G.H.Oliv. accepted as Erica plumosa Thunb. present
 Grisebachia plumosa]] (Thunb.) Klotzsch subsp. irrorata E.G.H.Oliv. accepted as Erica plumosa Thunb. present
 Grisebachia plumosa (Thunb.) Klotzsch subsp. pentheri (Klotzsch) E.G.H.Oliv. accepted as Erica plumosa Thunb. present
 Grisebachia plumosa (Thunb.) Klotzsch subsp. plumosa,  accepted as Erica plumosa Thunb. present
 Grisebachia rigida N.E.Br. accepted as Erica plumosa Thunb. present
 Grisebachia secundiflora E.G.H.Oliv. accepted as Erica lateriflora E.G.H.Oliv. present

Nagelocarpus
Genus Nagelocarpus:
 Nagelocarpus serratus (Thunb.) Bullock, accepted as Erica serrata Thunb. present

Platycalyx
Genus Platycalyx:
 Platycalyx pumila N.E.Br. accepted as Erica platycalyx E.G.H.Oliv. present

Salaxis
Genus Salaxis:
 Salaxis axillaris (Thunb.) G.Don, accepted as Erica axillaris Thunb. present
 Salaxis calyciflora (Tausch) Druce, accepted as Erica artemisioides (Klotzsch) E.G.H.Oliv. 
 Salaxis octandra Klotzsch, accepted as Erica axillaris Thunb. present
 Salaxis octandra Klotzsch var. artemisioides (Klotzsch) N.E.Br. accepted as Erica artemisioides (Klotzsch) E.G.H.Oliv. present
 Salaxis pumila N.E.Br. accepted as Erica bredasiana E.G.H.Oliv. present
 Salaxis triflora Compton, accepted as Erica terniflora E.G.H.Oliv. present

Scyphogyne
Genus Scyphogyne:
 Scyphogyne calcicola E.G.H.Oliv. accepted as Erica calcicola (E.G.H.Oliv.) E.G.H.Oliv. present
 Scyphogyne capitata (Klotzsch) Benth. var. capitata,  accepted as Erica phacelanthera E.G.H.Oliv. present
 Scyphogyne divaricata (Klotzsch) Benth. accepted as Erica rigidula (N.E.Br.) E.G.H.Oliv. present
 Scyphogyne eglandulosa (Klotzsch) Benth. accepted as Erica eglandulosa (Klotzsch) E.G.H.Oliv. present
 Scyphogyne fasciculata Benth. accepted as Erica eglandulosa (Klotzsch) E.G.H.Oliv. present
 Scyphogyne longistyla N.E.Br. accepted as Erica rigidula (N.E.Br.) E.G.H.Oliv. present
 Scyphogyne micrantha (Benth.) N.E.Br. accepted as Erica artemisioides (Klotzsch) E.G.H.Oliv. present
 Scyphogyne muscosa (Aiton) Druce, accepted as Erica muscosa (Aiton) E.G.H.Oliv. present
 Scyphogyne orientalis E.G.H.Oliv. accepted as Erica melanomontana E.G.H.Oliv. present
 Scyphogyne puberula (Klotzsch) Benth. accepted as Erica urceolata (Klotzsch) E.G.H.Oliv. present
 Scyphogyne remota N.E.Br. accepted as Erica remota (N.E.Br.) E.G.H.Oliv. present
 Scyphogyne tenuis (Benth.) E.G.H.Oliv. accepted as Erica miniscula E.G.H.Oliv. present
 Scyphogyne urceolata (Klotzsch) Benth. accepted as Erica urceolata (Klotzsch) E.G.H.Oliv. present

Simocheilus
Genus Simocheilus:
 Simocheilus acutangulus N.E.Br. accepted as Erica glabella Thunb. subsp. laevis E.G.H.Oliv. present
 Simocheilus albirameus N.E.Br. accepted as Erica inaequalis (N.E.Br.) E.G.H.Oliv. present
 Simocheilus barbiger Klotzsch, accepted as Erica uberiflora E.G.H.Oliv. present
 Simocheilus bicolor (Klotzsch) Klotzsch, accepted as Erica inaequalis (N.E.Br.) E.G.H.Oliv. present
 Simocheilus carneus Klotzsch, accepted as Erica uberiflora E.G.H.Oliv. present
 Simocheilus consors N.E.Br. accepted as Erica globiceps (N.E.Br.) E.G.H.Oliv. subsp. consors (N.E.Br.) E.G.H.Oliv. present
 Simocheilus depressus (Licht. ex Roem. & Schult.) Benth. var. depressus,  accepted as Erica glabella Thunb. subsp. glabella,  present
 Simocheilus depressus (Licht. ex Roem. & Schult.) Benth. var. patens N.E.Br. accepted as Erica glabella Thunb. subsp. glabella,  present
 Simocheilus dispar N.E.Br. accepted as Erica dispar (N.E.Br.) E.G.H.Oliv. present
 Simocheilus fourcadei (L.Guthrie) E.G.H.Oliv. accepted as Erica angulosa E.G.H.Oliv. present
 Simocheilus glaber (Thunb.) Benth. accepted as Erica inaequalis (N.E.Br.) E.G.H.Oliv. present
 Simocheilus globiferus N.E.Br. accepted as Erica glabella Thunb. subsp. laevis E.G.H.Oliv. present
 Simocheilus hirtus (Klotzsch) E.G.H.Oliv. accepted as Erica glabella Thunb. subsp. laevis E.G.H.Oliv. present
 Simocheilus multiflorus Klotzsch var. multiflorus,  accepted as Erica uberiflora E.G.H.Oliv. present
 Simocheilus multiflorus Klotzsch var. atherstonei N.E.Br. accepted as Erica uberiflora E.G.H.Oliv. present
 Simocheilus oblongus Benth. accepted as Erica dregei E.G.H.Oliv. present
 Simocheilus patulus N.E.Br. accepted as Erica glabella Thunb. subsp. laevis E.G.H.Oliv. present
 Simocheilus piquetbergensis N.E.Br. accepted as Erica piquetbergensis (N.E.Br.) E.G.H.Oliv. present
 Simocheilus puberulus (Klotzsch) E.G.H.Oliv. accepted as Erica inaequalis (N.E.Br.) E.G.H.Oliv. present
 Simocheilus pubescens Klotzsch, accepted as Erica uberiflora E.G.H.Oliv. present
 Simocheilus purpureus (P.J.Bergius) Druce, accepted as Erica glabella Thunb. subsp. glabella,  present
 Simocheilus quadrisulcus N.E.Br. accepted as Erica phaeocarpa (N.E.Br.) E.G.H.Oliv. present
 Simocheilus submuticus Benth. accepted as Erica glabella Thunb. subsp. laevis E.G.H.Oliv. present
 Simocheilus subrigidus N.E.Br. accepted as Erica glabella Thunb. subsp. laevis E.G.H.Oliv. present

Stokoeanthus
Genus Stokoeanthus:
 Stokoeanthus chionophilus E.G.H.Oliv. accepted as Erica stokoeanthus E.G.H.Oliv. present

Sympieza
Genus Sympieza:
 Sympieza eckloniana Klotzsch, accepted as Erica ecklonii E.G.H.Oliv. present
 Sympieza gracilis (Bartl.) E.G.H.Oliv. accepted as Erica benthamiana E.G.H.Oliv. present
 Sympieza labialis (Salisb.) Druce, accepted as Erica labialis Salisb. present

Syndesmanthus
Genus Syndesmanthus:
 Syndesmanthus articulatus (L.) Klotzsch var. articulatus,  accepted as Erica similis (N.E.Br.) E.G.H.Oliv. present
 Syndesmanthus articulatus (L.) Klotzsch var. fasciculatus N.E.Br. accepted as Erica similis (N.E.Br.) E.G.H.Oliv. present
 Syndesmanthus breviflorus N.E.Br. accepted as Erica brownii E.G.H.Oliv. present
 Syndesmanthus ciliatus (Klotzsch) Benth. accepted as Erica paucifolia (J.C.Wendl.) E.G.H.Oliv. subsp. ciliata (Klotzsch) E.G.H.Oliv. present
 Syndesmanthus elimensis N.E.Br. var. elimensis,  accepted as Erica similis (N.E.Br.) E.G.H.Oliv. present
 Syndesmanthus erinus (Klotzsch ex Benth.) N.E.Br. var. erinus,  accepted as Erica erinus (Klotzsch ex Benth.) E.G.H.Oliv. present
 Syndesmanthus erinus (Klotzsch ex Benth.) N.E.Br. var. validus N.E.Br. accepted as Erica erinus (Klotzsch ex Benth.) E.G.H.Oliv. present
 Syndesmanthus globiceps N.E.Br. accepted as Erica globiceps (N.E.Br.) E.G.H.Oliv. subsp. globiceps,  present
 Syndesmanthus gracilis (Benth.) N.E.Br. accepted as Erica globiceps (N.E.Br.) E.G.H.Oliv. subsp. gracilis (Benth.) E.G.H.Oliv. present
 Syndesmanthus nivenii N.E.Br. accepted as Erica niveniana E.G.H.Oliv. present
 Syndesmanthus paucifolius (J.C.Wendl.) Benth. accepted as Erica paucifolia (J.C.Wendl.) E.G.H.Oliv. subsp. paucifolia,  present
 Syndesmanthus pulchellus N.E.Br. accepted as Erica pulchelliflora E.G.H.Oliv. present
 Syndesmanthus pumilus N.E.Br. accepted as Erica innovans E.G.H.Oliv. present
 Syndesmanthus scaber Klotzsch, accepted as Erica similis (N.E.Br.) E.G.H.Oliv. present
 Syndesmanthus schlechteri N.E.Br. accepted as Erica agglutinans E.G.H.Oliv. present
 Syndesmanthus similis N.E.Br. accepted as Erica similis (N.E.Br.) E.G.H.Oliv. present
 Syndesmanthus squarrosus Benth. accepted as Erica paucifolia (J.C.Wendl.) E.G.H.Oliv. subsp. squarrosa (Benth.) E.G.H.Oliv. present
 Syndesmanthus sympeizoides N.E.Br. accepted as Erica globiceps (N.E.Br.) E.G.H.Oliv. subsp. globiceps,  present
 Syndesmanthus venustus N.E.Br. accepted as Erica venustiflora E.G.H.Oliv. subsp. venustiflora,  present
 Syndesmanthus viscosus (Bolus) N.E.Br. accepted as Erica viscosissima E.G.H.Oliv. present
 Syndesmanthus zeyheri Bolus, accepted as Erica globiceps (N.E.Br.) E.G.H.Oliv. subsp. globiceps,  present

Thamnus
Genus Thamnus:
 Thamnus multiflorus Klotzsch, accepted as Erica thamnoides E.G.H.Oliv. present

Thoracosperma
Genus Thoracosperma:
 Thoracosperma bondiae Compton, accepted as Erica rosacea (L.Guthrie) E.G.H.Oliv. subsp. rosacea,  present
 Thoracosperma fourcadei Compton, accepted as Erica rosacea (L.Guthrie) E.G.H.Oliv. subsp. rosacea,  present
 Thoracosperma galpinii N.E.Br. accepted as Erica rosacea (L.Guthrie) E.G.H.Oliv. subsp. rosacea,  present
 Thoracosperma interruptum N.E.Br. accepted as Erica interrupta (N.E.Br.) E.G.H.Oliv. present
 Thoracosperma marlothii N.E.Br. accepted as Erica rosacea (L.Guthrie) E.G.H.Oliv. subsp. glabrata E.G.H.Oliv. present
 Thoracosperma muirii L.Guthrie, accepted as Erica rosacea (L.Guthrie) E.G.H.Oliv. subsp. rosacea,  present
 Thoracosperma nanum N.E.Br. accepted as Erica bolusanthus E.G.H.Oliv. present
 Thoracosperma paniculatum (Thunb.) Klotzsch, accepted as Erica quadrifida (Benth.) E.G.H.Oliv. present
 Thoracosperma puberulum (Klotzsch) N.E.Br. accepted as Erica puberuliflora E.G.H.Oliv. present
 Thoracosperma radicans L.Guthrie, accepted as Erica radicans (L.Guthrie) E.G.H.Oliv. subsp. radicans,  present
 Thoracosperma rosaceum L.Guthrie, accepted as Erica rosacea (L.Guthrie) E.G.H.Oliv. subsp. rosacea,  present
 Thoracosperma viscidum L.Guthrie, accepted as Erica interrupta (N.E.Br.) E.G.H.Oliv. present

Vaccinium
Genus Vaccinium:
 Vaccinium exul Bolus, indigenous

Lecythidaceae
Family: Lecythidaceae,

Barringtonia
Genus Barringtonia:
 Barringtonia racemosa (L.) Roxb. indigenous

Maesaceae
Family: Maesaceae,

Maesa
Genus Maesa:
 Maesa alnifolia Harv. endemic
 Maesa lanceolata Forssk. indigenous

Myrsinaceae
Family: Myrsinaceae,

Ardisia
Genus Ardisia:
 Ardisia crenata Sims, not indigenous, naturalised, invasive
 Ardisia elliptica Thunb. not indigenous, naturalised, invasive

Embelia
Genus Embelia:
 Embelia ruminata (E.Mey. ex A.DC.) Mez, endemic

Myrsine
Genus Myrsine:
 Myrsine africana L. indigenous
 Myrsine pillansii Adamson, indigenous

Rapanea
Genus Rapanea:
 Rapanea gilliana (Sond.) Mez, endemic
 Rapanea melanophloeos (L.) Mez, indigenous

Primulaceae
Family: Primulaceae,

Anagallis
Genus Anagallis:
 Anagallis arvensis L. not indigenous, naturalised, invasive
 Anagallis arvensis L. subsp. arvensis,  not indigenous, naturalised
 Anagallis huttonii Harv. indigenous
 Anagallis pumila Sw. not indigenous, naturalised
 Anagallis tenuicaulis Baker, indigenous

Lysimachia
Genus Lysimachia:
 Lysimachia nutans Nees, endemic
 Lysimachia ruhmeriana Vatke, indigenous

Primula
Genus Primula:
 Primula malacoides Franch. not indigenous, cultivated, naturalised
 Primula vulgaris Huds. not indigenous, cultivated, naturalised

Roridulaceae
Family: Roridulaceae,

Roridula
Genus Roridula:
 Roridula dentata L. endemic
 Roridula gorgonias Planch. endemic

Sapotaceae
Family: Sapotaceae,

Chrysophyllum
Genus Chrysophyllum:
 Chrysophyllum viridifolium J.M.Wood & Franks, indigenous

Englerophytum
Genus Englerophytum:
 Englerophytum magalismontanum (Sond.) T.D.Penn. indigenous
 Englerophytum natalense (Sond.) T.D.Penn. indigenous

Inhambanella
Genus Inhambanella:
 Inhambanella henriquesii (Engl. & Warb.) Dubard, indigenous

Lecomtedoxa
Genus Lecomtedoxa:
 Lecomtedoxa henriquesii (Engl. & Warb.) A.Meeuse, accepted as Inhambanella henriquesii (Engl. & Warb.) Dubard, present

Manilkara
Genus Manilkara:
 Manilkara concolor (Harv.) Gerstner, indigenous
 Manilkara discolor (Sond.) J.H.Hemsl. indigenous
 Manilkara mochisia (Baker) Dubard, indigenous
 Manilkara nicholsonii A.E.van Wyk, endemic

Mimusops
Genus Mimusops:
 Mimusops caffra E.Mey. ex A.DC. indigenous
 Mimusops obovata Nees ex Sond. indigenous
 Mimusops obtusifolia Lam. indigenous
 Mimusops zeyheri Sond. indigenous

Sideroxylon
Genus Sideroxylon:
 Sideroxylon cymosum L.f. accepted as Olinia ventosa (L.) Cufod. indigenous
 Sideroxylon inerme L. indigenous
 Sideroxylon inerme L. subsp. inerme,  indigenous

Vitellariopsis
Genus Vitellariopsis:
 Vitellariopsis dispar (N.E.Br.) Aubrev. indigenous
 Vitellariopsis marginata (N.E.Br.) Aubrev. indigenous

Theophrastaceae
Family: Theophrastaceae,

Samolus
Genus Samolus:
 Samolus porosus (L.f.) Thunb. endemic
 Samolus valerandi L. indigenous

References

South African plant biodiversity lists
Ericales